= History of the battery =

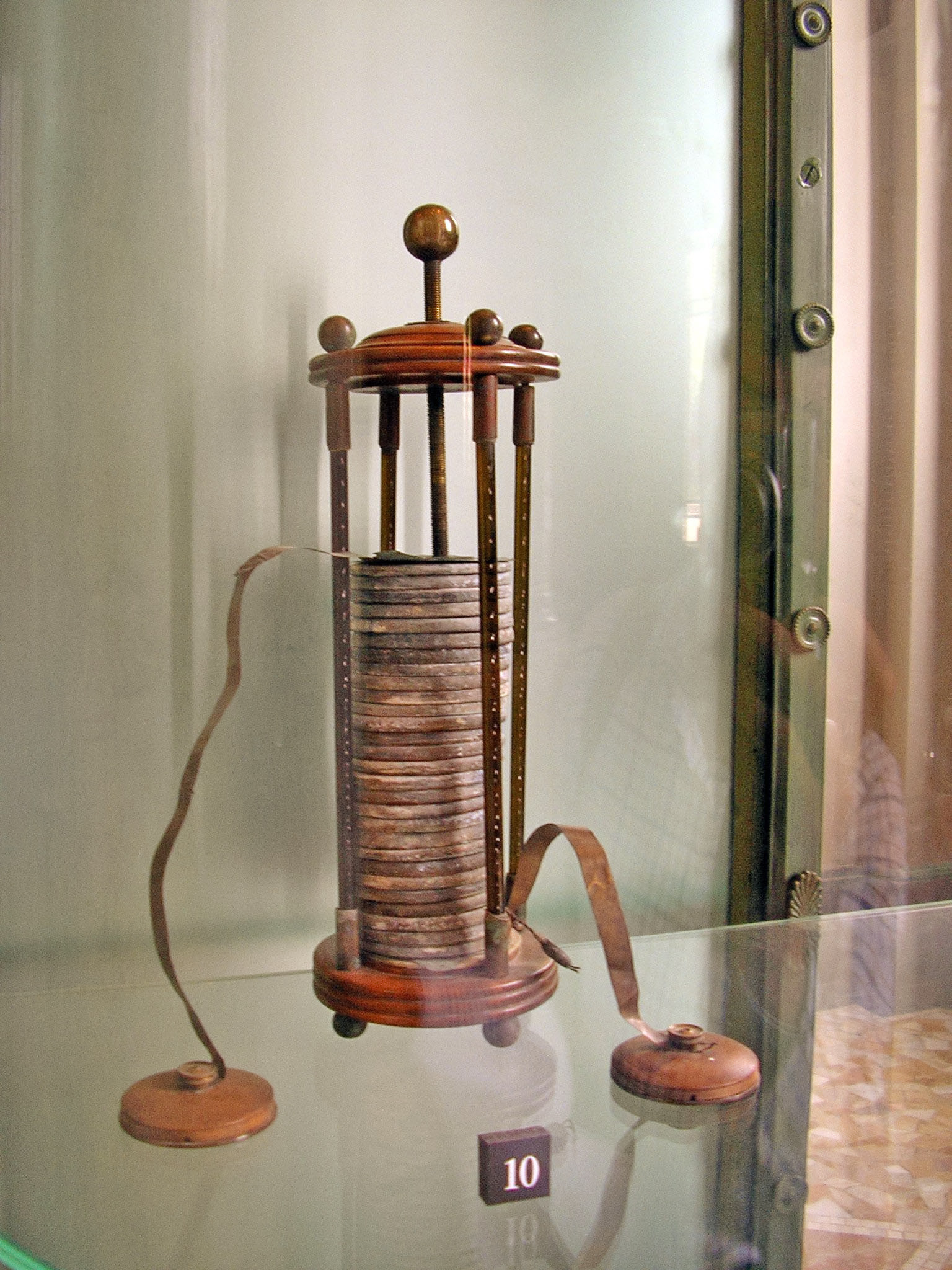
A voltaic pile, the first chemical battery

Batteries provided the main source of electricity before the development of electric generators and electrical grids around the end of the 19th century. Successive improvements in battery technology facilitated major electrical advances, from early scientific studies to the rise of telegraphs and telephones, eventually leading to portable computers, mobile phones, electric cars, and many other electrical devices.

"Wet cell" batteries used open containers that held liquid electrolyte and metallic electrodes. Electrodes and electrolytes could be replaced when the battery was discharged. Open containers are unsuitable for mobile or portable use. Wet cells were used commercially in the telegraph and telephone systems. Early electric cars used semi-sealed wet cells. Portable and hand-held electrical devices were made feasible with the "dry cell", where the electrolyte was in the form of a paste resistant to spilling or leakage.

One important classification for batteries is by their life cycle. "Primary" batteries can produce current as soon as assembled, but once the active elements are consumed, they cannot be electrically recharged. The development of the lead-acid battery and subsequent "secondary" or "chargeable" types allowed energy to be restored to the cell, extending the life of permanently assembled cells. The introduction of nickel and lithium based batteries in the latter half of the 20th century made the development of innumerable portable electronic devices feasible, from powerful flashlights to mobile phones. Very large stationary batteries find some applications in grid energy storage, helping to stabilize electric power distribution networks.

== Invention ==
From the mid 18th century on, before there were batteries, experimenters used Leyden jars to store electrical charge. As an early form of capacitor, Leyden jars, unlike electrochemical cells, stored their charge physically and would release it all at once. Many experimenters took to hooking several Leyden jars together to create a stronger charge and one of them, the colonial American inventor Benjamin Franklin, may have been the first to call his grouping an "electrical battery", a play on the military term for weapons functioning together.

Based on some findings by Luigi Galvani, Alessandro Volta, a friend and fellow scientist, observed that electrical phenomena were caused by two different metals joined by a moist intermediary. He verified this hypothesis through experiments and published the results in 1791. In 1800, Volta invented the first true battery, storing and releasing a charge through a chemical reaction instead of physically, which came to be known as the voltaic pile. The voltaic pile consisted of pairs of copper and zinc discs piled on top of each other, separated by a layer of cloth or cardboard soaked in brine (i.e., the electrolyte). Unlike the Leyden jar, the voltaic pile produced continuous electricity and stable current, and lost little charge over time when not in use, though his early models could not produce a voltage strong enough to produce sparks. He experimented with various metals and found that zinc and silver gave the best results.

Volta believed the current was the result of two different materials simply touching each other, what he called contact tension, and not the result of chemical reactions. As a consequence, he regarded the corrosion of the zinc plates as an unrelated flaw that could perhaps be fixed by changing the materials somehow. However, no scientist ever succeeded in preventing this corrosion. In fact, it was observed that the corrosion was faster when a higher current was drawn. This suggested that the corrosion was actually integral to the battery's ability to produce a current. This, in part, led to the rejection of Volta's approach in favor of the electrochemical theory. (Note that Volta's term is a component of a related process contact electrification which is important for other science.) Volta's illustrations of his Crown of Cups and voltaic pile have extra metal disks, now known to be unnecessary, on both the top and bottom. The figure associated with this section, of the zinc-copper voltaic pile, has the modern design, an indication that "contact tension" is not the source of electromotive force for the voltaic pile.

Volta's original pile models had some technical flaws, one of them involving the electrolyte leaking and causing short-circuits due to the weight of the discs compressing the brine-soaked cloth. A Scotsman named William Cruickshank solved this problem by laying the elements horizontally in a box instead of piling them in a stack. This was known as the trough battery. Volta himself invented a variant that consisted of a chain of cups filled with a salt solution, linked together by metallic arcs dipped into the liquid. This was known as the Crown of Cups. These arcs were made of two different metals (e.g., zinc and copper) soldered together. This model also proved to be more efficient than his original piles, though it did not prove as popular.

A zinc-copper voltaic pile

Another problem with Volta's batteries was short battery life (an hour's worth at best), which was caused by two phenomena. The first was that the current produced electrolyzed the electrolyte solution, resulting in a film of hydrogen bubbles forming on the copper, which steadily increased the internal resistance of the battery (this effect, called polarization, is counteracted in modern cells by additional measures). The other was a phenomenon called local action, wherein minute short-circuits would form around impurities in the zinc, causing the zinc to degrade. The latter problem was solved in 1835 by the English inventor William Sturgeon, who found that amalgamated zinc, whose surface had been treated with some mercury, did not suffer from local action.

Despite its flaws, Volta's batteries provide a steadier current than Leyden jars, and made possible many new experiments and discoveries, such as the first electrolysis of water by the English surgeon Anthony Carlisle and the English chemist William Nicholson.

== First practical batteries ==
Schematic representation of Daniell's original cell

=== Daniell cell ===
An English professor of chemistry named John Frederic Daniell found a way to solve the hydrogen bubble problem in the Voltaic Pile by using a second electrolyte to consume the hydrogen produced by the first. In 1836, he invented the Daniell cell, which consists of a copper pot filled with a copper sulfate solution, in which is immersed an unglazed earthenware container filled with sulfuric acid and a zinc electrode. The earthenware barrier is porous, which allows ions to pass through but keeps the solutions from mixing.

The Daniell cell was a great improvement over the existing technology used in the early days of battery development and was the first practical source of electricity. It provides a longer and more reliable current than the Voltaic cell. It is also safer and less corrosive. It has an operating voltage of roughly 1.1 volts. It soon became the industry standard for use, especially with the new telegraph networks.

The Daniell cell was also used as the first working standard for definition of the volt, which is the unit of electromotive force.

=== Bird's cell ===
A version of the Daniell cell was invented in 1837 by the Guy's Hospital physician Golding Bird who used a plaster of Paris barrier to keep the solutions separate. Bird's experiments with this cell were of some importance to the new discipline of electrometallurgy.

=== Porous pot cell ===
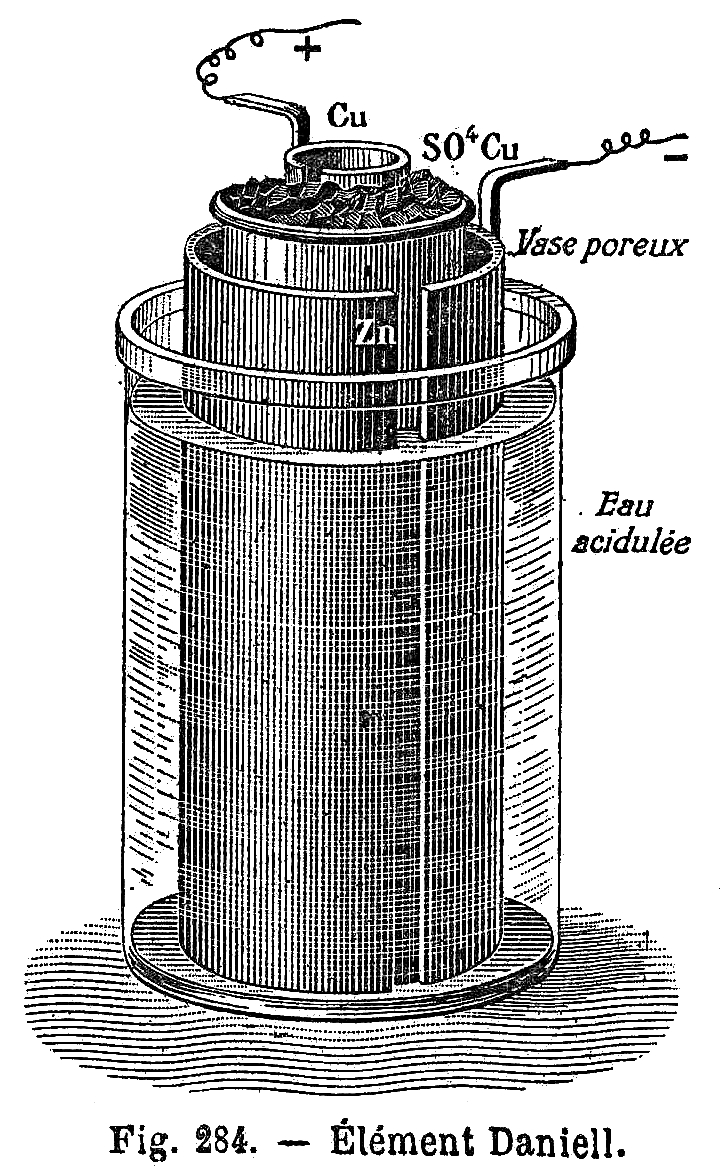
Porous pot cell

The porous pot version of the Daniell cell was invented by John Dancer, a Liverpool instrument maker, in 1838. It consists of a central zinc anode dipped into a porous earthenware pot containing a zinc sulfate solution. The porous pot is, in turn, immersed in a solution of copper sulfate contained in a copper can, which acts as the cell's cathode. The use of a porous barrier allows ions to pass through but keeps the solutions from mixing.

=== Gravity cell ===
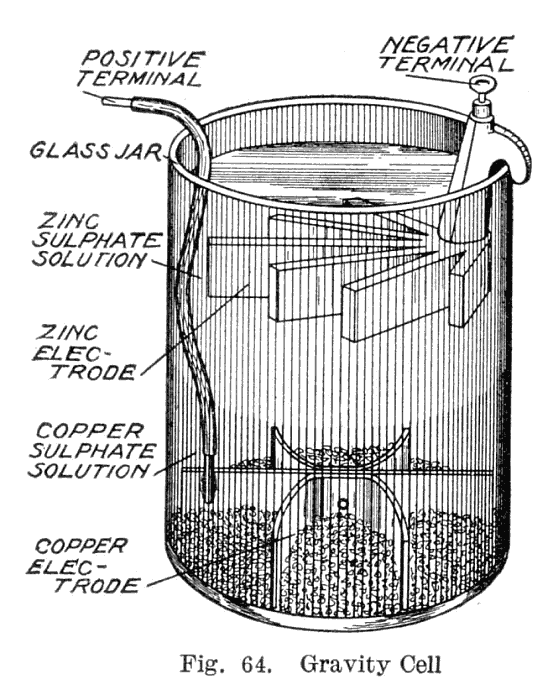
A 1919 illustration of a gravity cell. This particular variant is also known as a crowfoot cell due to distinctive shape of the electrodes.

In the 1860s, a Frenchman named Callaud invented a variant of the Daniell cell called the gravity cell. This simpler version dispensed with the porous barrier. This reduces the internal resistance of the system and, thus, the battery yields a stronger current. It quickly became the battery of choice for the American and British telegraph networks, and was widely used until the 1950s.

The gravity cell consists of a glass jar, in which a copper cathode sits on the bottom and a zinc anode is suspended beneath the rim. Copper sulfate crystals are scattered around the cathode and then the jar is filled with distilled water. As the current is drawn, a layer of zinc sulfate solution forms at the top around the anode. This top layer is kept separate from the bottom copper sulfate layer by its lower density and by the polarity of the cell.

The zinc sulfate layer is clear in contrast to the deep blue copper sulfate layer, which allows a technician to measure the battery life with a glance. On the other hand, this setup means the battery can be used only in a stationary appliance, or else the solutions mix or spill. Another disadvantage is that a current has to be continually drawn to keep the two solutions from mixing by diffusion, so it is unsuitable for intermittent use.

=== Poggendorff cell ===
The German scientist Johann Christian Poggendorff overcame the problems with separating the electrolyte and the depolariser using a porous earthenware pot in 1842. In the Poggendorff cell, sometimes called Grenet Cell due to the works of Eugene Grenet around 1859, the electrolyte is dilute sulphuric acid and the depolariser is chromic acid. The two acids are physically mixed together, eliminating the porous pot. The positive electrode (cathode) is two carbon plates, with a zinc plate (negative or anode) positioned between them. Because of the tendency of the acid mixture to react with the zinc, a mechanism is provided to raise the zinc electrode clear of the acids.

The cell provides 1.9 volts. It was popular with experimenters for many years due to its relatively high voltage; greater ability to produce a consistent current and lack of any fumes, but the relative fragility of its thin glass enclosure and the necessity of having to raise the zinc plate when the cell is not in use eventually saw it fall out of favour. The cell was also known as the 'chromic acid cell', but principally as the 'bichromate cell'. This latter name came from the practice of producing the chromic acid by adding sulphuric acid to potassium dichromate, even though the cell itself contains no dichromate.

The Fuller cell was developed from the Poggendorff cell. Although the chemistry is principally the same, the two acids are once again separated by a porous container and the zinc is treated with mercury to form an amalgam.

=== Grove cell ===
The Welshman William Robert Grove invented the Grove cell in 1839. It consists of a zinc anode dipped in sulfuric acid and a platinum cathode dipped in nitric acid, separated by porous earthenware. The Grove cell provides a high current and nearly twice the voltage of the Daniell cell, which made it the favoured cell of the American telegraph networks for a time. However, it gives off poisonous nitric oxide fumes when operated. The voltage also drops sharply as the charge diminishes, which became a liability as telegraph networks grew more complex. Platinum was and still is very expensive.

=== Dun cell ===
Alfred Dun 1885, nitro-muriatic acid (aqua regis) – iron and carbon:

In the new element there can be used advantageously as exciting-liquid in the first case such solutions as have in a concentrated condition great depolarizing-power, which effect the whole depolarization chemically without necessitating the mechanical expedient of increased carbon surface. It is preferred to use iron as the positive electrode, and as exciting-liquid nitro muriatic acid (aqua regis), the mixture consisting of muriatic and nitric acids. The nitro-muriatic acid, as explained above, serves for filling both cells. For the carbon-cells it is used strong or very slightly diluted, but for the other cells very diluted, (about one-twentieth, or at the most one-tenth). The element containing in one cell carbon and concentrated nitro-muriatic acid and in the other cell iron and dilute nitro-muriatic acid remains constant for at least twenty hours when employed for electric incandescent lighting.

== Rechargeable batteries and dry cells ==
=== Lead-acid ===
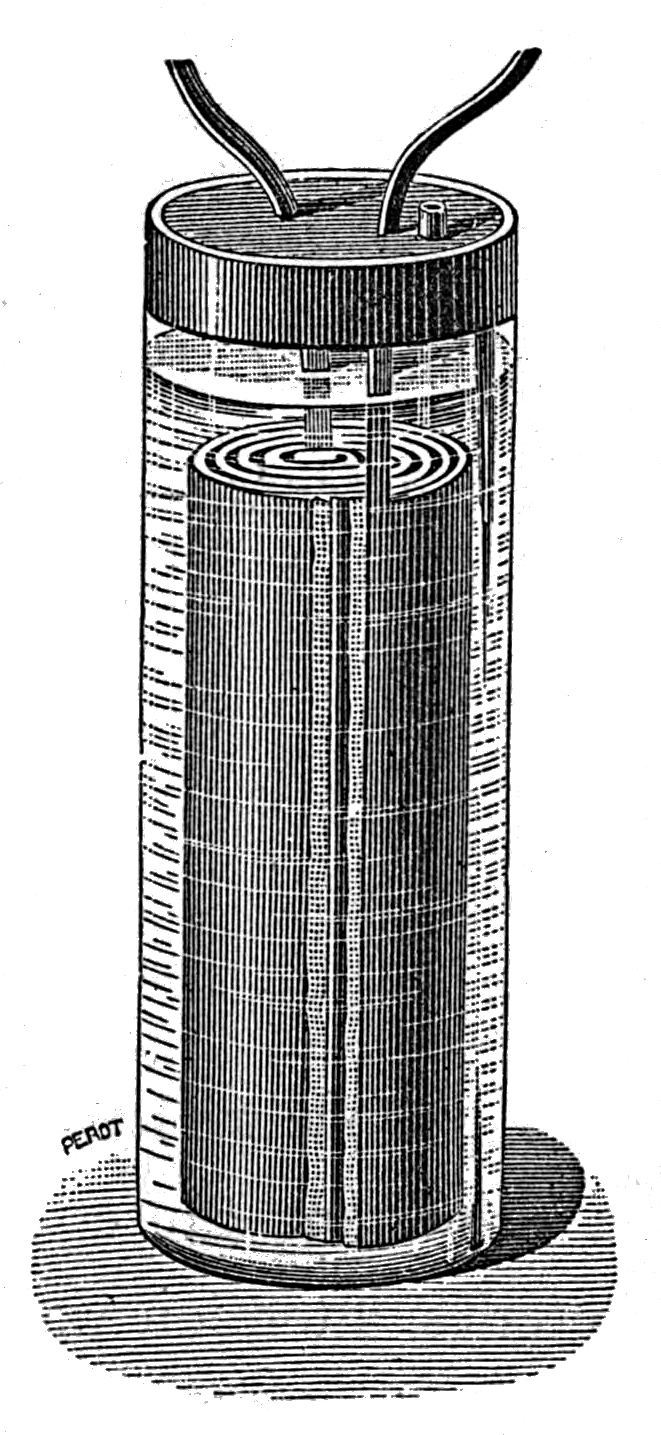
19th-century illustration of Planté's original lead-acid cell

Up to this point, all existing batteries would be permanently drained when all their chemical reactants were spent. In 1859, Gaston Planté invented the lead–acid battery, the first-ever battery that could be recharged by passing a reverse current through it. A lead-acid cell consists of a lead anode and a lead dioxide cathode immersed in sulfuric acid. Both electrodes react with the acid to produce lead sulfate, but the reaction at the lead anode releases electrons whilst the reaction at the lead dioxide consumes them, thus producing a current. These chemical reactions can be reversed by passing a reverse current through the battery, thereby recharging it.

Planté's first model consisted of two lead sheets separated by rubber strips and rolled into a spiral. His batteries were first used to power the lights in train carriages while stopped at a station. In 1881, Camille Alphonse Faure invented an improved version that consists of a lead grid lattice into which is pressed a lead oxide paste, forming a plate. Multiple plates can be stacked for greater performance. This design is easier to mass-produce.

Compared to other batteries, Planté's is rather heavy and bulky for the amount of energy it can hold. However, it can produce remarkably large currents in surges, because it has very low internal resistance, meaning that a single battery can be used to power multiple circuits.

The lead-acid battery is still used today in automobiles and other applications where weight is not a big factor. The basic principle has not changed since 1859. In the early 1930s, a gel electrolyte (instead of a liquid) produced by adding silica to a charged cell was used in the LT battery of portable vacuum-tube radios. In the 1970s, "sealed" versions became common (commonly known as a "gel cell" or "SLA"), allowing the battery to be used in different positions without failure or leakage.

Today cells are classified as "primary" if they produce a current only until their chemical reactants are exhausted, and "secondary" if the chemical reactions can be reversed by recharging the cell. The lead-acid cell was the first "secondary" cell.

=== Leclanché cell ===
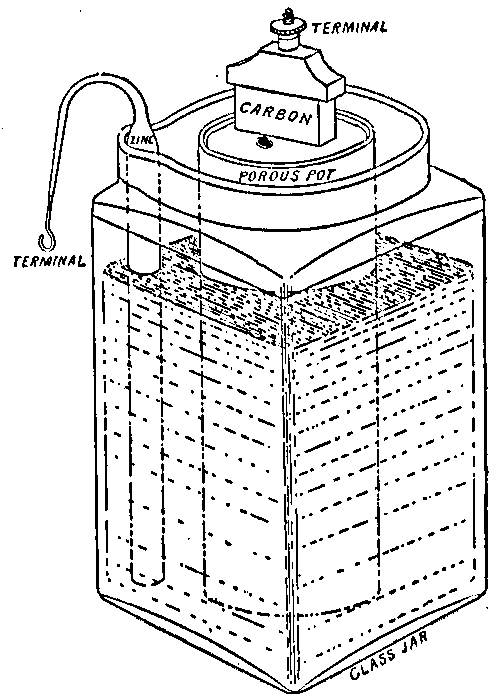
A 1912 illustration of a Leclanché cell

In 1866, Georges Leclanché invented a battery that consists of a zinc anode and a manganese dioxide cathode wrapped in a porous material, dipped in a jar of ammonium chloride solution. The manganese dioxide cathode has a little carbon mixed into it as well, which improves conductivity and absorption. It provided a voltage of 1.4 volts. This cell achieved very quick success in telegraphy, signaling, and electric bell work.

The dry cell form was used to power early telephones—usually from an adjacent wooden box affixed to fit batteries before telephones could draw power from the telephone line itself. The Leclanché cell can not provide a sustained current for very long. In lengthy conversations, the battery would run down, rendering the conversation inaudible. This is because certain chemical reactions in the cell increase the internal resistance and, thus, lower the voltage.

=== Zinc-carbon cell, the first dry cell ===
Many experimenters tried to immobilize the electrolyte of an electrochemical cell to make it more convenient to use. The Zamboni pile of 1812 is a high-voltage dry battery but capable of delivering only minute currents. Various experiments were made with cellulose, sawdust, spun glass, asbestos fibers, and gelatine.

In 1886, Carl Gassner obtained a German patent on a variant of the Leclanché cell, which came to be known as the dry cell because it does not have a free liquid electrolyte. Instead, the ammonium chloride is mixed with plaster of Paris to create a paste, with a small amount of zinc chloride added in to extend the shelf life. The manganese dioxide cathode is dipped in this paste, and both are sealed in a zinc shell, which also acts as the anode. In November 1887, he obtained U.S. patent 373,064 for the same device.

Unlike previous wet cells, Gassner's dry cell is more solid, does not require maintenance, does not spill, and can be used in any orientation. It provides a potential of 1.5 volts. The first mass-produced model was the Columbia dry cell, first marketed by the National Carbon Company in 1896. The NCC improved Gassner's model by replacing the plaster of Paris with coiled cardboard, an innovation that left more space for the cathode and made the battery easier to assemble. It was the first convenient battery for the masses and made portable electrical devices practical, and led directly to the invention of the flashlight.

The zinc–carbon battery (as it came to be known) is still manufactured today.

In parallel, in 1887 Wilhelm Hellesen developed his own dry cell design. It has been claimed that Hellesen's design preceded that of Gassner.

In 1887, a dry-battery was developed by Sakizō Yai (屋井 先蔵) of Japan, then patented in 1892. In 1893, Sakizō Yai's dry-battery was exhibited in World's Columbian Exposition and commanded considerable international attention.

=== NiCd, the first alkaline battery ===
In 1899, a Swedish scientist named Waldemar Jungner invented the nickel–cadmium battery, a rechargeable battery that has nickel and cadmium electrodes in a potassium hydroxide solution; the first battery to use an alkaline electrolyte. It was commercialized in Sweden in 1910 and reached the United States in 1946. The first models were robust and had significantly better energy density than lead-acid batteries, but were much more expensive.

== 20th century: new technologies and ubiquity ==
| Size | Year introduced |
|---|---|
| D | 1898 |
| AA | 1907 |
| AAA | 1911 |
| 9V | 1956 |

=== Nickel-iron ===
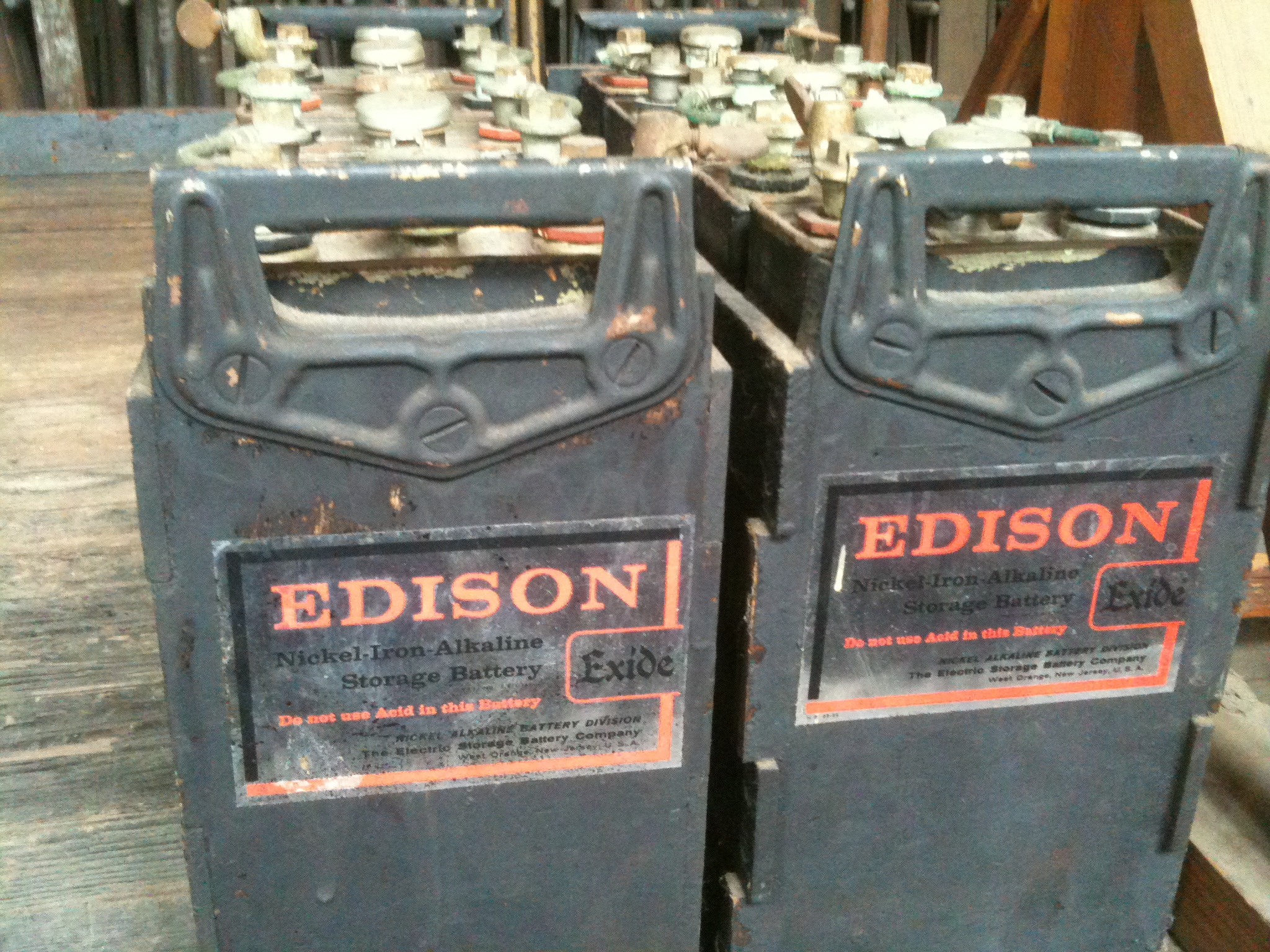
Nickel-iron batteries manufactured between 1972 and 1975 under the "Exide" brand, originally developed in 1901 by Thomas Edison

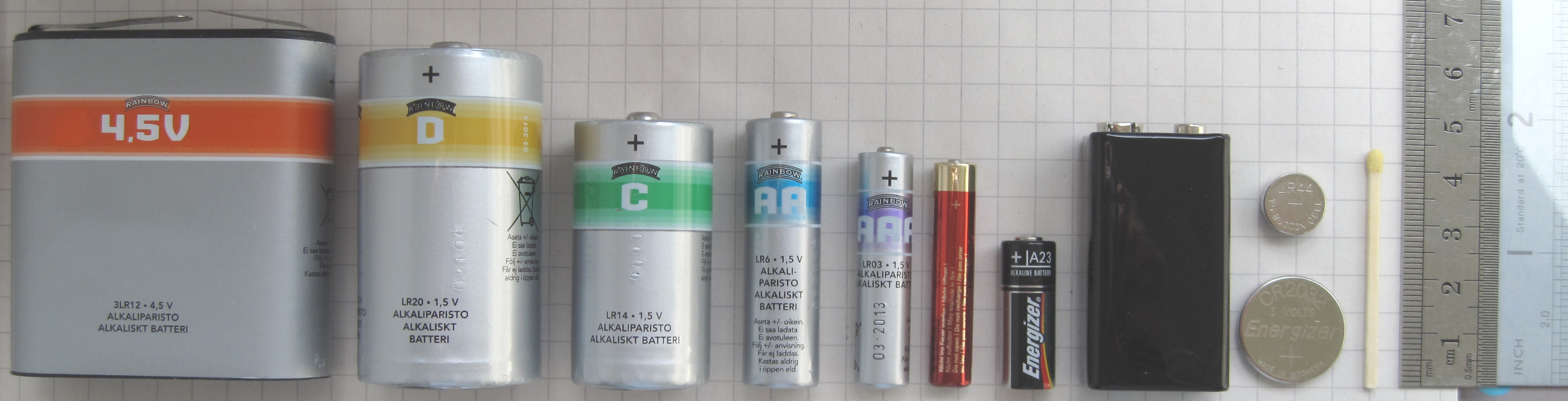
A set of modern batteries

Waldemar Jungner patented a nickel–iron battery in 1899, the same year as his Ni-Cad battery patent, but found it to be inferior to its cadmium counterpart and, as a consequence, never bothered developing it. It produced a lot more hydrogen gas when being charged, meaning it could not be sealed, and the charging process was less efficient (it was, however, cheaper).

Seeing a way to make a profit in the already competitive lead-acid battery market, Thomas Edison worked in the 1890s on developing an alkaline based battery that he could get a patent on. Edison thought that if he produced a lightweight and durable battery electric cars would become the standard, with his firm as its main battery vendor. After many experiments, and probably borrowing from Jungner's design, he patented an alkaline based nickel–iron battery in 1901. However, customers found his first model of the alkaline nickel–iron battery to be prone to leakage leading to short battery life, and it did not outperform the lead-acid cell by much either. Although Edison was able to produce a more reliable and powerful model seven years later, by this time the inexpensive and reliable Model T Ford had made gasoline engine cars the standard. Nevertheless, Edison's battery achieved great success in other applications such as electric and diesel-electric rail vehicles, providing backup power for railroad crossing signals, or to provide power for the lamps used in mines.

=== Common alkaline batteries ===
Until the late 1950s, the zinc–carbon battery continued to be a popular primary cell battery, but its relatively low battery life hampered sales. The Canadian engineer Lewis Urry, working for the Union Carbide, first at the National Carbon Co. in Ontario and, by 1955, at the National Carbon Company Parma Research Laboratory in Cleveland, Ohio, was tasked with finding a way to extend the life of zinc-carbon batteries. Building on earlier work by Edison, Urry decided instead that alkaline batteries held more promise. Until then, longer-lasting alkaline batteries were unfeasibly expensive. Urry's battery consists of a manganese dioxide cathode and a powdered zinc anode with an alkaline electrolyte. Using powdered zinc gives the anode a greater surface area. These batteries were put on the market in 1959.

=== Nickel–hydrogen and nickel–metal hydride ===
The nickel–hydrogen battery entered the market as an energy-storage subsystem for commercial communication satellites.

The first consumer grade nickel–metal hydride batteries (NiMH) for smaller applications appeared on the market in 1989 as a variation of the 1970s nickel–hydrogen battery. NiMH batteries tend to have longer lifespans than NiCd batteries (and their lifespans continue to increase as manufacturers experiment with new alloys) and, since cadmium is toxic, NiMH batteries are less damaging to the environment.

=== Alkali metal-ion batteries ===
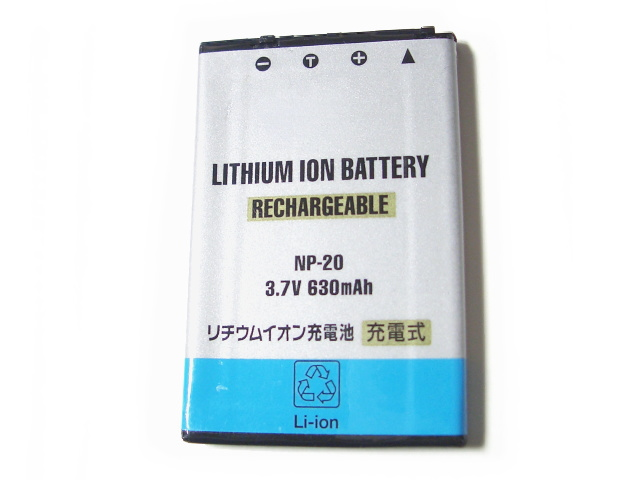
Lithium-ion battery

Since 1991, the cost of lithium-ion batteries has declined by 99%. On average, the price declined about 19% for each doubling of installed capacity.

Lithium is the alkali metal with lowest density and with the greatest electrochemical potential and energy-to-weight ratio. The low atomic weight and small size of its ions also speeds its diffusion, likely making it an ideal battery material. Experimentation with lithium batteries began in 1912 under American physical chemist Gilbert N. Lewis, but commercial lithium batteries did not come to market until the 1970s in the form of the lithium-ion battery. Three volt lithium primary cells such as the CR123A type and three volt button cells are still widely used, especially in cameras and very small devices.

Three important developments regarding lithium batteries occurred in the 1980s. In 1980, an American chemist, John B. Goodenough, discovered the LiCoO_{2} (Lithium cobalt oxide) cathode (positive lead) and a Moroccan research scientist, Rachid Yazami, discovered the graphite anode (negative lead) with the solid electrolyte. In 1981, Japanese chemists Tokio Yamabe and Shizukuni Yata discovered a novel nano-carbonacious-PAS (polyacene) and found that it was very effective for the anode in the conventional liquid electrolyte. This led a research team managed by Akira Yoshino of Asahi Chemical, Japan, to build the first lithium-ion battery prototype in 1985, a rechargeable and more stable version of the lithium battery; Sony commercialized the lithium-ion battery in 1991. In 2019, John Goodenough, Stanley Whittingham, and Akira Yoshino, were awarded the Nobel Prize in Chemistry, for their development of lithium-ion batteries.

In 1997, the lithium polymer battery was released by Sony and Asahi Kasei. These batteries hold their electrolyte in a solid polymer composite instead of in a liquid solvent, and the electrodes and separators are laminated to each other. The latter difference allows the battery to be encased in a flexible wrapping instead of in a rigid metal casing, which means such batteries can be specifically shaped to fit a particular device. This advantage has favored lithium polymer batteries in the design of portable electronic devices such as mobile phones and personal digital assistants, and of radio-controlled aircraft, as such batteries allow for a more flexible and compact design. They generally have a lower energy density than normal lithium-ion batteries.

High costs and concerns about mineral extraction associated with lithium chemistry have renewed interest in sodium-ion battery development, with early electric vehicle product launches in 2023.

== See also ==
- Baghdad Battery, an artifact that has similar properties to a modern battery
- Memory effect
- Comparison of commercial battery types
- History of electrochemistry
- List of battery sizes
- List of battery types
- Search for the Super Battery, a 2017 PBS film
- Burgess Battery Company

== Notes and references ==
1. “Advances in solid-state batteries: Materials, interfaces, characterizations, and devices.” MRS Bulletin, 16 Jan. 2024, link.springer.com/article/10.1557/s43577-023-00649-7.
2. Volle, Adam. “Solid-state battery | Definition, History, & Facts.” Britannica, www.britannica.com/technology/solid-state-battery.
