= Leclanché =

Leclanché S.A.
- Type: Private
- ISIN: CH0110303119
- Founded: 1909; 117 years ago
- Headquarters: Yverdon-les-Bains, Switzerland
- Key people: Pierre Blanc (CEO), Alexander Rhea (Chairman),
- Products: Lithium-ion cells for large industrial e-mobility applications and energy storage solutions
- Revenue: CHF20M (2022)
- Operating income: CHF85M (2022)
- Number of employees: 357 (2023)
- Website: www.leclanche.com

Leclanché is a Swiss lithium-ion cells and related technologies manufacturer founded in 1909. It currently employs over 350 staff and is listed on the SIX Swiss Exchange (ticker symbol "LECN"). The company has its headquarters in Yverdon-les-Bains, Switzerland and production facilities in Willstätt in the state of Baden-Württemberg, Germany. Leclanché is the only listed pure play energy storage company in the world.

== History ==
Leclanché was founded in 1909 in Yverdon-les-Bains in the Swiss canton of Vaud. The company is named after the Leclanché cell invented and patented by the French scientist Georges Leclanché in 1866. Through the integration of a spin-off from the German research organization Fraunhofer-Gesellschaft in 2006, the company pivoted from a traditional battery manufacturer to become a developer and manufacturer of lithium-ion cells.

In 2017, the company announced a trial to install energy storage batteries at sites owned by Dutch charging station operator Fastned.

Since 2020, the company has been quite active in the production of heavy duty industrial battery packs for usage in rail, marine and heavy-duty ground vehicles applications.

As of 2021, Leclanché was producing about 400,000 cells (pouch/flat cells) per year.

== Technology ==
Through a licensed ceramic separator technology and focus on lithium–titanate technology, Leclanché manufactures large-format lithium-ion cells. At the end of the second quarter 2012, Leclanché started operations of its first production line with an installed annual capacity of up to 76 MWh in lithium titanate cells.

In 2024 the company introduced a cell with a niobium-based anode, reported as having 50% higher energy density than its lithium titanate cells.

== See also ==
- Georges Leclanché
- Zinc–carbon battery
