= Carl Gassner =

German physician, scientist and inventor

- Born: 17 November 1855; Mainz (Germany)
- Died: 31 January 1942
- Occupation: Physician

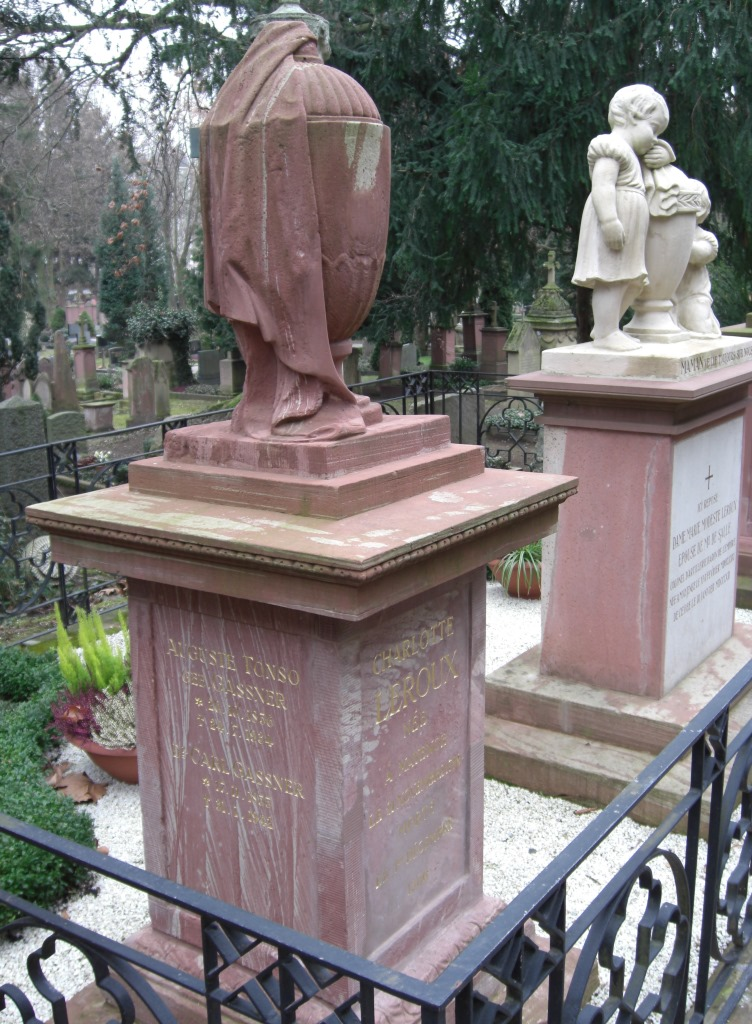
Grave of Carl Gassner at the main cemetery of Mainz

Carl Gassner was a German physician (17 November 1855 in Mainz – 31 January 1942), scientist and inventor, better known to have contributed to improve the Leclanché cell and to have fostered the development of the first dry cell, also known as the zinc–carbon battery, less likely to break or leak and that could be effectively industrially produced at large scale.

== Life ==
Gassner studied the medicine at the University of Strasbourg and then practiced in Mainz (Germany) as a specialist in diseases of the eyes and ears. He also conducted experiments in physics and chemistry at the Balbach watchmaking industry.

=== Invention of dry cell ===
In 1880, most of the door bells operated with a wet Leclanché cell containing an aqueous electrolyte solution which often dried out, rendering the cell unusable. To remediate this inconvenience, in 1876, Georges Leclanché started to jellify the electrolyte of his cell by adding starch to the ammonium chloride, making also his cell more portable.

In 1885, Gassner also decided to modify the Leclanché cell by immobilising the liquid electrolyte in plaster of Paris used as a porous binder, to which he added hydrophilic chemicals and zinc chloride. The purpose of the addition of ZnCl_{2} was to limit the corrosion rate of the zinc anode when the cell is not used and so to extend the service life of the cell. On 8 April 1886 he obtained a patent in Germany, and on 15 November 1887 in the United States. He also obtained different patents in Austria-Hungary, Belgium, France and England. His dry cell became known in 1890, when a friend of his shopkeeper asked him for help because the door bell did not work. Later also the other dealers wanted his dry cell.

Subsequently, the director of the Erfurt post-office ordered 100,000 batteries, forcing Gassner to establish a factory in Frankfurt. He could have earned millions of marks, but for peace he renounced all the rights of the Frankfurt company and the production was interrupted. He is buried in the main cemetery of Mainz.

== Zinc-carbon battery ==
The global chemical reaction occurring in the zinc-carbon battery is the following:

$\mathsf{Zn + 2~MnO_2 + 2~NH_4Cl \rightarrow 2~MnO(OH) + [Zn(NH_3)_2]Cl_2}$

== See also ==
- History of the battery
- Georges Leclanché
- Leclanché cell
- Zinc-carbon battery
