= Georges Leclanché =

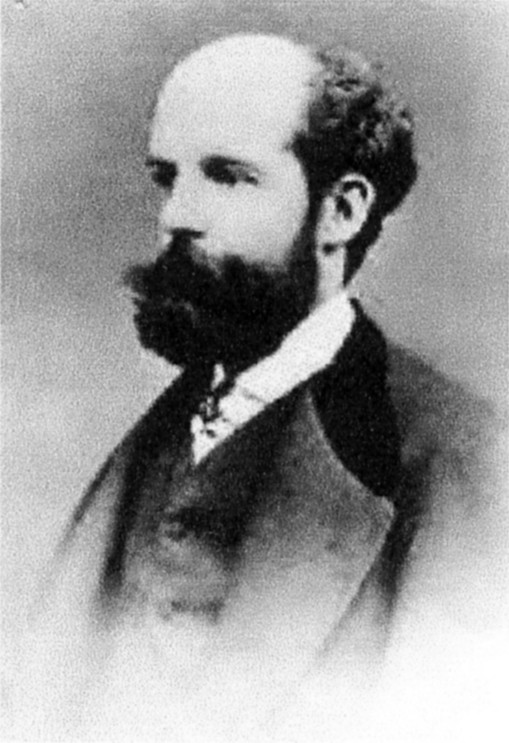

Georges Leclanché (9 October 1839 – 14 September 1882) was a French electrical engineer chiefly remembered for his invention of the Leclanché cell, one of the first modern electrical batteries and the forerunner of the modern dry cell battery.

== Biography ==
Leclanché was born in 1839 in Parmain (Seine-et-Oise), France, the son of Léopold Leclanché and Eugenie of Villeneuve. Due to the political situation in France, and because his father was a former minister, his parents, also friends of the writer Victor Hugo, decided to take the way of exile in the United Kingdom. He was thus educated in England but completed his education at École Centrale des Arts et Manufactures (École Centrale Paris), one of the top engineering schools in France, graduating in 1860 to begin work as an engineer. He first worked for a French railways company where he was in charge of communication infrastructures related to the electrical transmission of time. His interest for the development of efficient electrical cells arose from the problems affecting the existing generation of cells used at this time in the railways. Because of the political situation in France, he emigrated in Brussels in Belgium where he built a small laboratory. It is there that he developed a first cell based on copper carbonate and then his electrical cell based on zinc reducing agent and manganese oxide oxidizing agent. His invention was rapidly adopted by the Belgian telegraph administration and the railways company of The Netherlands.

After the fall of Napoléon III, he came back in France in Paris where he became associated with Ernest Barbier to found the cells factory "Leclanché-Barbier". He was the main manufacturer of cells in France. Georges Leclanché died from a throat cancer on 14 September 1882 in Paris around the age of 43.

After his death, his brother Maurice took over the business and his son Max also continued to improve and to commercialise his invention.

== Leclanché cell ==
In 1866 he invented the Leclanché cell, one of the first electrical batteries and the forerunner of the modern dry cell battery. It comprised a conducting solution (electrolyte) of ammonium chloride with a negative terminal of zinc (anode/oxidation) and a positive terminal of manganese dioxide (cathode/reduction).

Leclanché's "wet cell" (as it was popularly called) was the forerunner to the world's first widely used battery, the zinc–carbon battery.

In 1876, Leclanché jellifies the electrolyte of his cell by adding starch to the ammonium chloride, making his cell more portable.

== Leclanché company ==
The Leclanché factory successfully developed until the beginning of the 20th century when it encountered the concurrence of many new producers such as the Wonder cells (founded in 1914). The enterprise changed several times of hands, was bought by the Fulmen battery company and finally by the CGE group.

The name Leclanché is presently used by a company based in Yverdon in Switzerland and founded in 1909. In 2006, this company acquired the German society Bullith which became the "Leclanché Lithium GmbH", based today in Willstätt (Baden-Württemberg in Germany).

== Trivia ==
- Rue Georges Leclanché, a street in Paris, is named after him

== See also ==
- Alkaline cell, a variant of the Leclanché cell (NH_{4}Cl replaced by KOH)
- Leclanché cell
- Leclanché company
- Carl Gassner, who improved the dry cell in 1888 (use of a first plaster gel)
