= Porous pot cell =

Porous pot cell refers to the construction of an electromotive cell using unglazed pottery as a barrier and may refer to:

- The Daniell cell
- The Leclanché cell
