= Battery leakage =

Escape of chemicals from within an electric battery

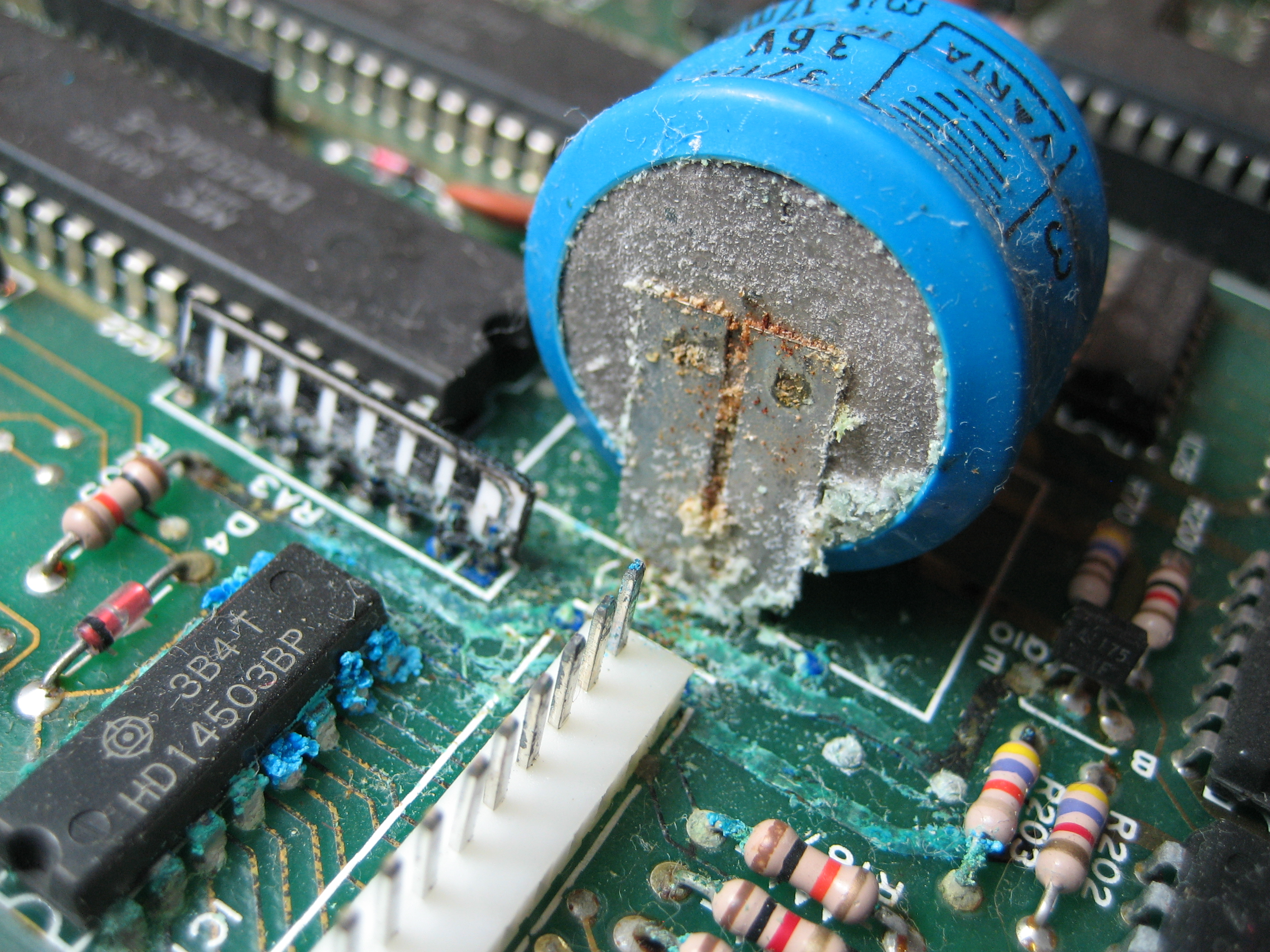
A nickel–cadmium Varta barrel battery that has leaked onto the mainboard of a Korg Poly-61, causing massive corrosion to circuit board traces and legs of integrated circuits.

Battery leakage is the escape of chemicals, such as electrolytes, within an electric battery due to generation of pathways to the outside environment caused by factory or design defects, excessive gas generation, or physical damage to the battery. The leakage of battery chemical often causes destructive corrosion to the associated equipment and may pose a health hazard.

== Leakage by type ==
=== Primary ===
==== Zinc–carbon ====
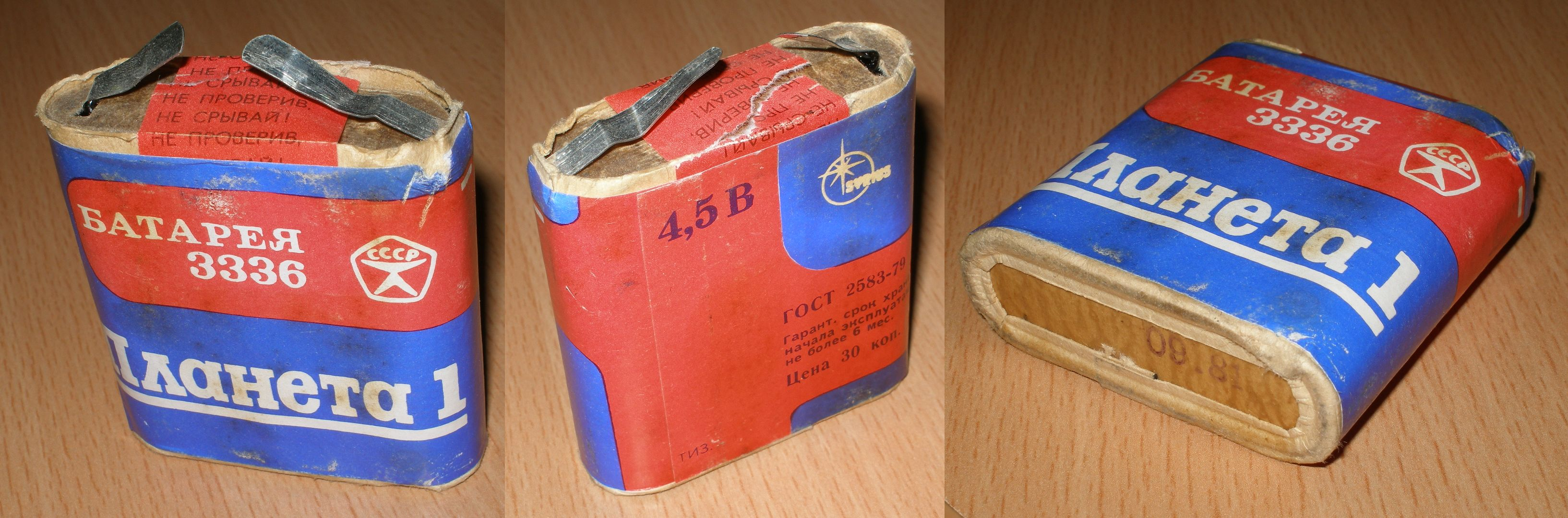
A USSR-manufactured 4.5V zinc–carbon battery from 1981

Zinc–carbon batteries were the first commercially available battery type and are still somewhat frequently used, although they have largely been replaced by the similarly composed alkaline battery. Like the alkaline battery, the zinc–carbon battery contains manganese dioxide and zinc electrodes. Unlike the alkaline battery, the zinc–carbon battery uses ammonium chloride as the electrolyte (zinc chloride in the case of "heavy-duty" zinc–carbon batteries), which is acidic.

The zinc case of the cell acts as one of the electrodes and is therefore eroded during use; the electrolyte will also slowly corrode the casing when not in use. Either when it has been completely discharged or after three to five years from its manufacture (its shelf life), a zinc–carbon battery is prone to leaking. The byproducts of the leakage may include manganese hydroxide, zinc ammonium chloride, ammonia, zinc chloride, zinc oxide, water and starch. This combination of materials is corrosive to metals, such as those of the battery contacts and surrounding circuitry.

Anecdotal evidence suggests that zinc–carbon battery leakage can be effectively cleaned with sodium bicarbonate (baking soda).

==== Alkaline ====
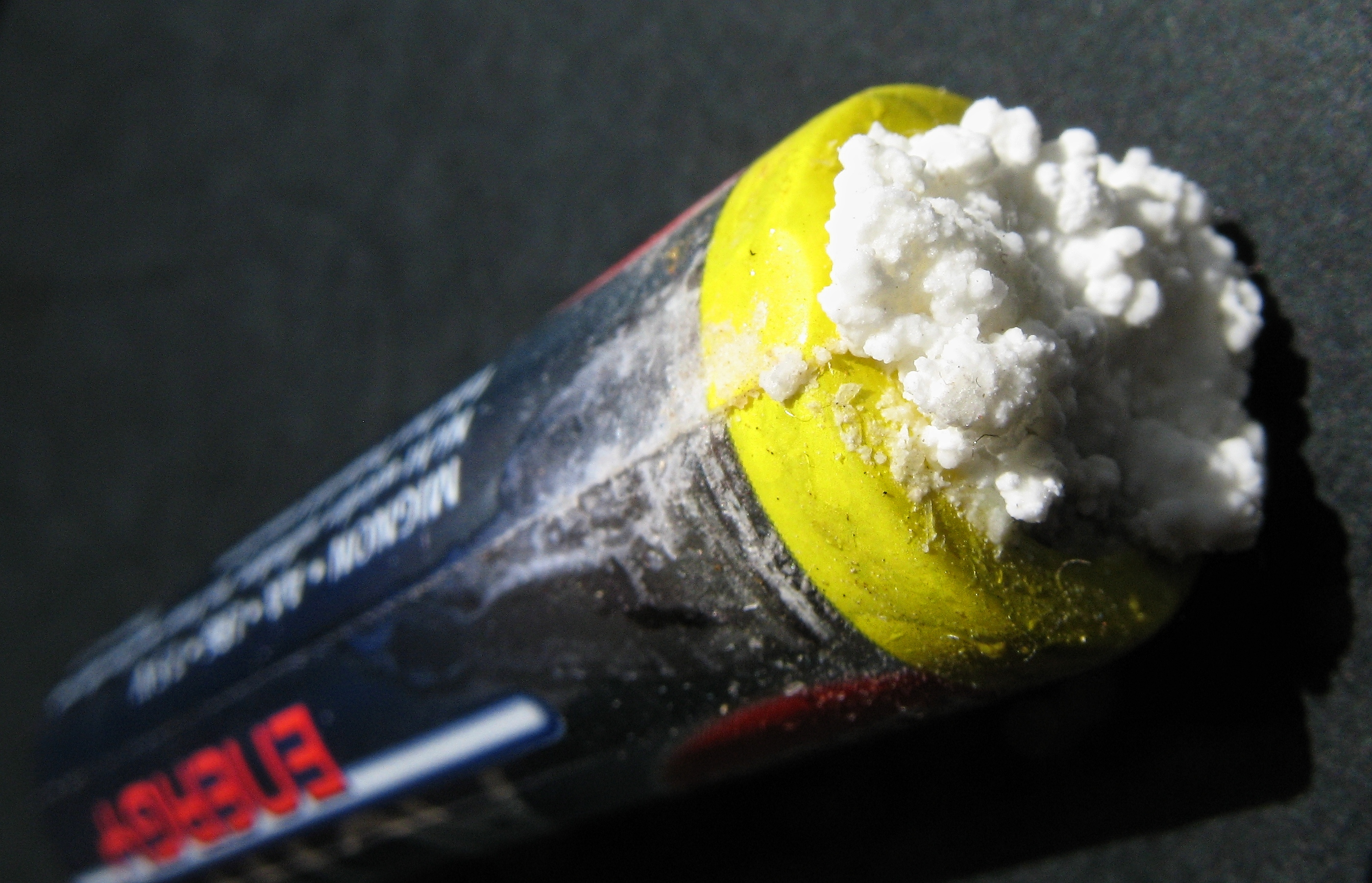
A leaking AA alkaline battery

Alkaline batteries use manganese dioxide and zinc electrodes with an electrolyte of potassium hydroxide. The alkaline battery gets its name from the replacement of the acidic ammonium chloride of zinc–carbon batteries with potassium hydroxide, which is an alkali. Alkaline batteries are considerably more efficient, more environmentally friendly, and more shelf-stable than zinc–carbon batteries—five to ten years, when stored at room temperature. Alkaline batteries largely replaced zinc–carbon batteries in regular use by 1990.

After an alkaline battery has been spent, or as it reaches the ends of its shelf life, the chemistry of its cells change, and hydrogen gas is generated as a byproduct. When enough pressure has been built up internally, the casing splits at the bases or side (or both), releasing manganese oxide, zinc oxide, potassium hydroxide, zinc hydroxide, and manganese hydroxide.

Alkaline battery leakage can be effectively neutralized with lemon juice or distilled white vinegar. Eye protection and rubber gloves should be worn, as the potassium hydroxide electrolyte is caustic.

=== Rechargeable ===
==== Nickel–cadmium (Ni-Cd) ====
Nickel–cadmium batteries (Ni-Cd) use nickel oxide hydroxide and metallic cadmium electrodes with an electrolyte of potassium hydroxide. Sealed Ni-Cd batteries were widely used in photography equipment, handheld power tools, and radio-controlled toys from the early 1940s until the early 1990s, when nickel–metal hydride batteries supplanted them (like how alkaline batteries replaced zinc–carbon batteries). In personal computers, Ni-Cd batteries first saw use in the mid-1980s as a cheaper alternative to lithium batteries for powering real-time clocks and preserving BIOS settings. Nickel–cadmium batteries were also briefly used in laptop battery packs, until the advent of commercially viable nickel–metal hydride batteries in the early 1990s. Ni-Cd batteries are still used in some uninterruptible power supplies and emergency lighting setups.

Except in aeronautical or other high-risk applications, Ni-Cd batteries are intentionally not hermetically sealed and include pressure vents for safety if the batteries are charged improperly. With age and sufficient thermal cycles the seal will degrade and allow electrolyte to leak through. The leakage usually travels down the positive and/or negative terminals onto any surrounding circuitry (see the top image).

As with alkaline battery leakage, Ni-Cd leakage can be effectively neutralized with lemon juice or distilled white vinegar.

==== Nickel–metal hydride (Ni-MH) ====
Nickel–metal hydride batteries (Ni-MH) largely replaced Ni-Cd batteries in the early 1990s. They replaced the metallic cadmium electrode with a hydrogen-absorbing alloy, allowing it to have over two times the capacity of Ni-Cd batteries while being easier to recycle. Their heyday in computer equipment was in the early- to mid-1990s. By 1995, most motherboard manufacturers switched to non-rechargeable lithium button cells to keep the BIOS chip powered. Lithium-based battery packs replaced Ni-MH packs in all but the lowest-end laptops by the early 2000s.

The practical shelf life of a Ni-MH is roughly five years. Cylindrical jelly-roll Ni-MH cells, like the ones used in 1990s laptop battery packs, discharge at a rate of up to 2% per day, while button cells like the ones used in motherboard batteries discharge at a rate of less than 20% per month. They are said to leak less frequently than alkaline batteries but have a similar failure mode.

Ni-MH leakage can be effectively neutralized with lemon juice or distilled white vinegar.

== History ==
In the United States in 1964, the Federal Trade Commission proscribed the use of the word leakproof or the phrase "guaranteed leakproof" in advertisements for or on the packages of dry-cell batteries, as they had determined that no manufacturer had yet developed a battery that was truly impervious to leaking. The FTC repealed this ban in 1997.
