= Sakizō Yai =

Sakizō Yai 屋井先蔵
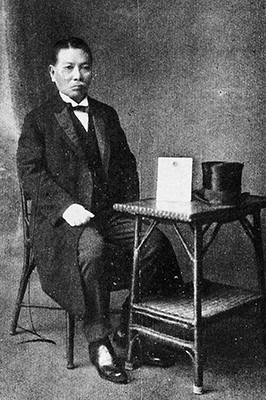
- Sakizō Yai
- Born: January 13, 1864; Nagaoka Domain, Echigo Province, Japan
- Died: June 1, 1927 (aged 63)
- Occupation: Businessman
- Known for: Inventing dry cell battery

Sakizō Yai (屋井 先蔵, January 13, 1864 - June 1, 1927) was a Japanese businessman and the inventor of a type of dry cell battery.

== Life ==
Sakizō Yai was born on January 13, 1864, at the house of Yai, to a samurai family in the Nagaoka Domain (currently Nagaoka, Niigata Prefecture). The Yai family was an upper-class samurai family which held a property of more than 300 koku for generations, but at the age of six Sakizō's father died and the house went bankrupt. After this, his mother and his uncle took him over.

In 1885, at the age of 21, Yai invented a continuous electric clock powered by wet-cell batteries. Electrically-powered clocks already existed, but they had conventional spring-powered clockwork movements, with electricity used to wind up the spring, while Yai's was a breakthrough, powered directly by a battery he had made. This continuous electric clock was recognized as the first electric patent in Japan in 1891.

In 1887, Yai was successful in inventing a dry cell electric battery. However, he could not apply for a patent immediately because he could not pay the application fee for the patent, and the patent for the first dry battery in Japan was obtained by the electrician Ichisaburo Takahashi. Carl Gassner patented the dry cell battery in Germany and Helensen patented the dry cell battery in Denmark in 1888.

In 1893, the Tokyo Imperial University's seismograph was exhibited at the 1893 World's Columbian Exposition, and the stored-charge batteries used in it surprised the visitors.

In 1927, he suffered from gastric cancer, and died suddenly of acute pneumonia on June 1 of that year. He was 63 years old.
