= Wilhelm Hellesen =

Danish inventor and industrialist

Frederik Louis Wilhelm Hellesen
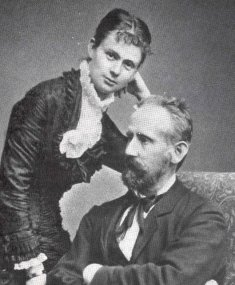
- F. L .Wilhelm Hellesen and wife (circa 1890).
- Born: 2 February 1836; Kalundborg, Denmark
- Died: 22 December 1892 (aged 56); Frederiksberg, Denmark

Frederik Louis Wilhelm Hellesen (2 February 1836 – 22 December 1892) was a Danish inventor and industrialist. In 1887 he designed what is thought to be the first dry cell battery based on the Leclanché cell design.

== Career ==
The same year he founded the company W. Hellesen. In 1889 he sold his first batteries to the Danish Telephone Company. The same year a young chemist Valdemar Ludvigsen (1861–1939) came to the factory helping by the further development of the batteries. When Frederik Hellesen died in 1892 his widow took over the company with the help of Ludvigsen. In 1906 V. Ludvigsen became the sole owner of the factory with the name A/S Hellesens Enke & V. Ludvigsen. (later known as A/S Tudor-Hellesens, A/S Hellesens, and GN Hellesens), now defunct.

== Legacy ==
Today the Hellesens brand name is owned by Duracell. In 1992 the Danish company was sold to GP Batteries International in Singapore belonging to Gold Peak Industries Ltd. Hong Kong. In 2005 the last factory in Thisted was closed and all machinery were shipped to a new factory in Malaysia.
