= Valdemar Ludvigsen =

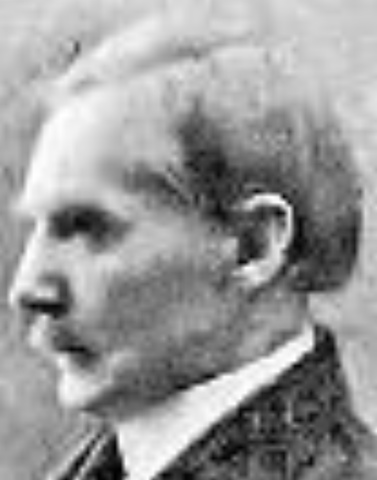
Valdemar Ludvigsen

Hans Valdemar Ludvigsen (20 September 1861 – 11 February 1939) was a Danish businessman and landowner. He owned the Hellesens battery manufacturer in Copenhagen.

== Early life and education ==
Ludvigsen was born on 20 September 1861 in Copenhagen, the son of Christian Adam L. (1826-1900) and Henriette Frederikke Geisler (1834-1927). His father owned a chemical factory. He attended Odense Cathedral School before studying Applied Chemistry.

He also traveled to England and North and Central America, where he studied electrical chemistry and telephone engineering.

== Career ==
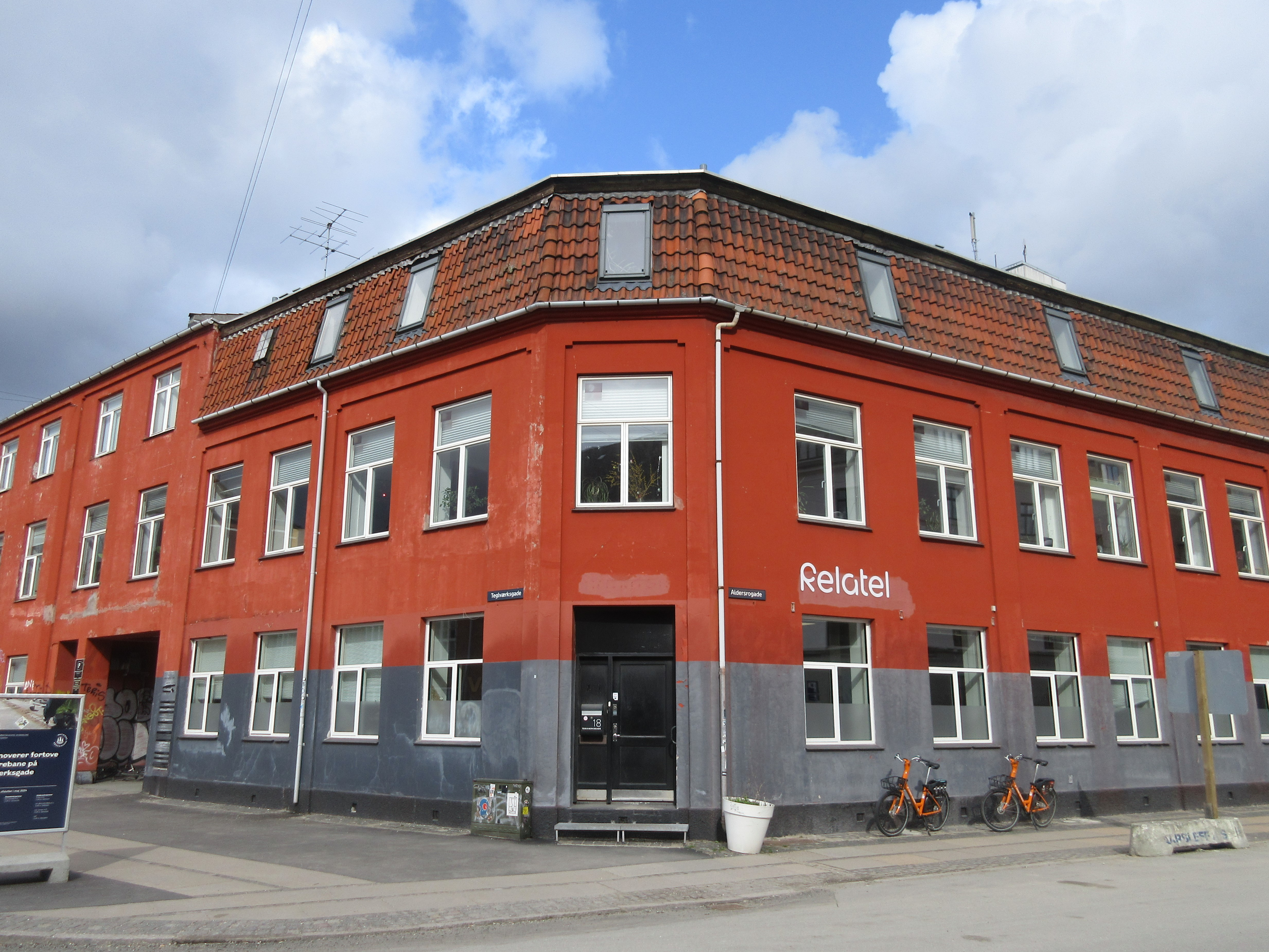
Hellesen's former factory at Aldersrogade 6 in Copenhagen

After returning to Denmark in 1887, he partnered with Wilhelm Hellesen who had just obtained a patent on a dry cell battery. In rented premises at Blågårdsgade, Hellesen and Ludvigsen continued to work on the invention. After Hellesen's death, it was commercialized by Ludvigsen and Hellesen's widow as Hellesens Enke / V. Ludvigsen. In 1896 Lidvigsen succeeded in finding the composition of the electrolyte paste that conditioned its durability.

In 1906, Ludvigsen became the sole owner of the company. In 1918, it was converted into a limited company as Hellesens Enke & V. Ludvigsen A/S. Ludvigsen remained chairman of the board until his death in 1939. A new factory was constructed at Aldersrodgade in the same year.

== Personal life ==
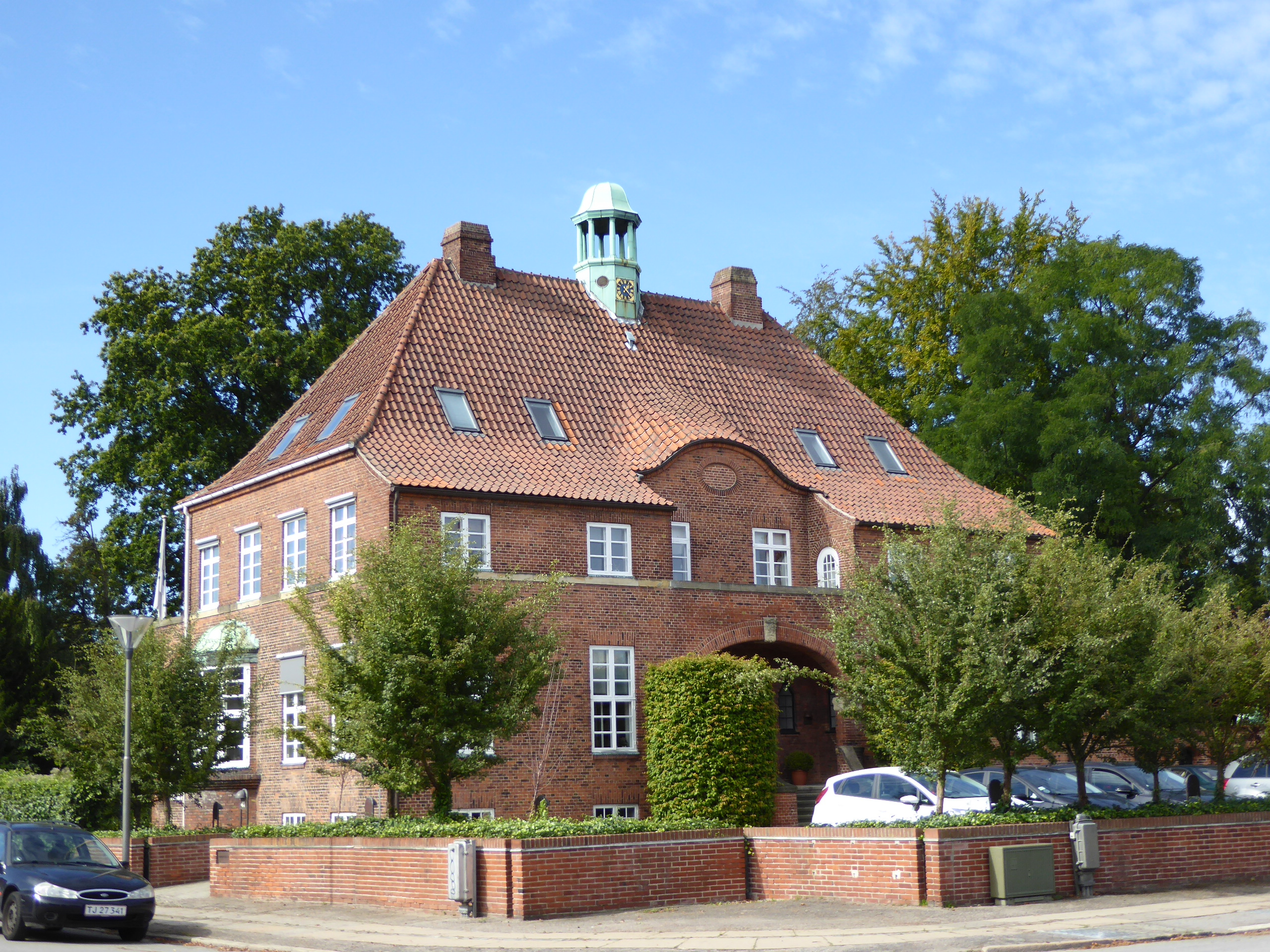
Ludvigsen's former home at Svanemøllevej 41 in Copenhagen

Æudvigsen married on 2 May 1891 in Copenhagen to Amalie Eggertine Prætorius (1869-1933). She was a daughter of navigation teacher Hans Vilhelm Prætorius (1828–1902) and Eggertine Sophie Frederikke Amalie Wellejus (1843–97).

Ludvigsen owned a large villa at Svanemållevej 41 in Copenhagen's fashionable Ryvangen neighbourhood. The house was constructed for him to designs by the architect Carl Brummer. In 1913, he purchased Holtumgårde with Holtumbjerg Plantage at Arnborg. In 1927, he also purchased Østrupgård at Fåborg.

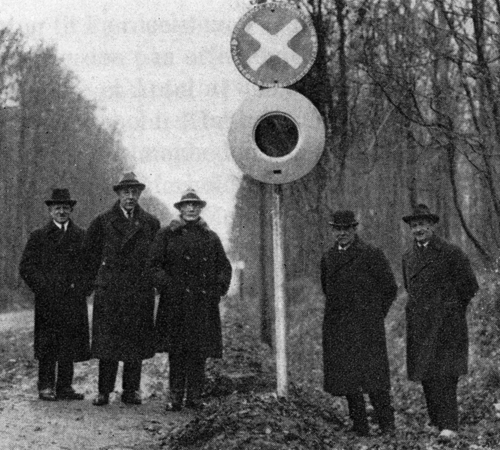
Ludvigsen (third man from the left) with other members of the Royal Danish Automobile Club

Ludvigsen was an honorary member of the Danish Scouts Corps and the Royal Danish Automobile Club.

In 1900, he was appointed as Guatamalen consul in Copenhagen. 1926 saw him appointed as consul-general. He was a member of the Royal Danish Academy of Science and Technology. He was created a Knight of the Order of the Dannebrog in 1913 and was awarded the Cross of Honour in 1937.
