= Manganese(II) hydroxide =

Names
- Other names Manganese dihydroxide, manganese hydroxide, Manganous hydroxide, Pyrochroite

Identifiers
CAS Number	18933-05-6; 1310-97-0
3D model (JSmol)	Interactive image
ChEBI	CHEBI:143901
ChemSpider	66594
ECHA InfoCard	100.126.826
EC Number	606-171-3
PubChem CID	73965
CompTox Dashboard (EPA)	DTXSID10940448 DTXSID6061656, DTXSID10940448
- InChI: InChI=1S/Mn.2H2O/h;2*1H2/q+2;;/p-2 Key: IPJKJLXEVHOKSE-UHFFFAOYSA-L
- SMILES: [OH-].[OH-].[Mn+2]

Properties
Chemical formula	H_{2}MnO_{2}
Molar mass	88.952 g·mol^{−1}
Appearance	white to pink solid
Density	3.258 g/cm^{3}
Melting point	140 °C (284 °F; 413 K) decomposes
Solubility in water	0.00034 g/100 mL at 18 °C.
Solubility	soluble in acid
Refractive index (n_{D})	1.68

Structure
Crystal structure	hexagonal
- Except where otherwise noted, data are given for materials in their standard state (at 25 °C [77 °F], 100 kPa). Infobox references

Manganese(II) hydroxide is the inorganic compound with the formula Mn(OH)_{2}. It is a white solid although samples darken quickly upon exposure to air owing to oxidation. It is poorly soluble in water.

== Structure, preparation, and reactions ==
Mn(OH)_{2} adopts the brucite structure, i.e. the arrangement of the atoms in the crystal are the same as the arrangement of the atoms in Mg(OH)_{2}. The Mn(II) centers are bonded to six hydroxide ligands. Each hydroxide ligand bridges to three Mn(II) sites. The O-H bonds are perpendicular to the planes defined by the oxygen atoms, projecting above and below these layers.

Manganese(II) hydroxide precipitates as a solid when an alkali metal hydroxide is added to an aqueous solution of Mn^{2+} salt:

Mn^{2+} + 2 NaOH → Mn(OH)_{2} + 2 Na^{+}

Manganese(II) hydroxide oxidises readily in air, as indicated by darkening of samples.

The compound adopts the brucite structure, as do several other metal dihydroxides.
