= Leclanché cell =

Battery (cell) with an anode of zinc and a cathode of manganese dioxide

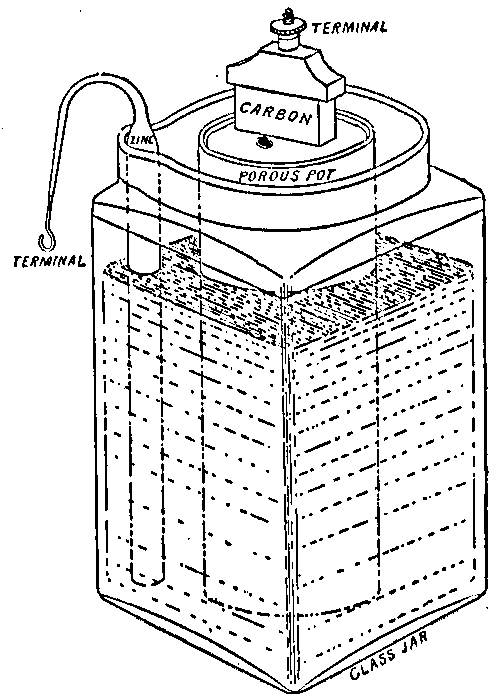
A 1919 illustration of a Leclanché cell

The Leclanché cell is a battery invented and patented by the French scientist Georges Leclanché in 1866. The battery contained a conducting solution (electrolyte) of ammonium chloride, a cathode (positive terminal) of carbon, a depolarizer of manganese dioxide (oxidizer), and an anode (negative terminal) of zinc (reductant). The chemistry of this cell was later successfully adapted to manufacture a dry cell.

== History ==
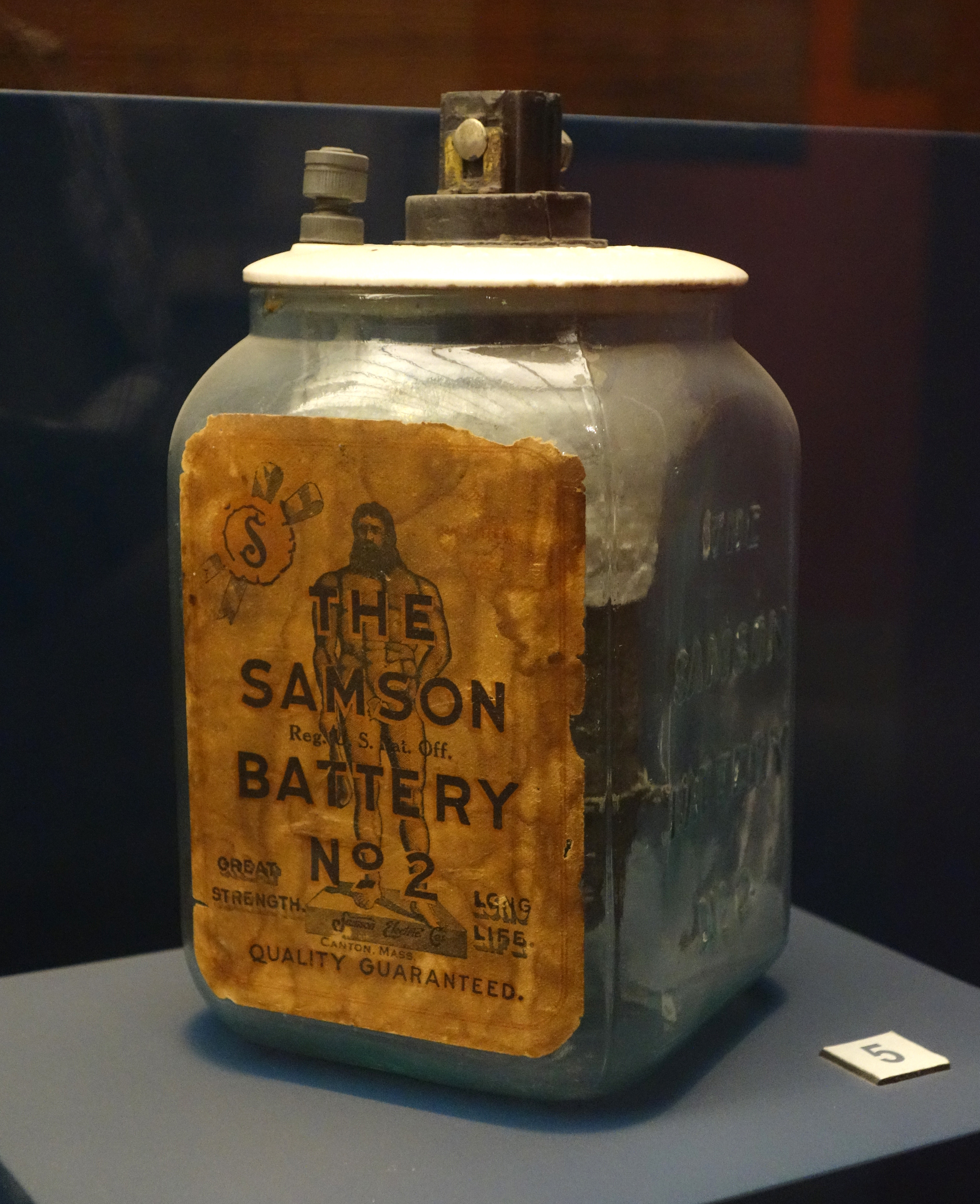
The Samson Battery No. 2, a Leclanché cell battery manufactured by the Samson Electric Co. of Canton, Massachusetts, c. 1868

In 1866, Georges Leclanché invented a battery that consisted of a zinc anode and a manganese dioxide cathode wrapped in a porous material, dipped in a jar of ammonium chloride solution. The manganese dioxide cathode had a little carbon mixed into it as well, which improved conductivity and absorption. It provided a voltage of 1.4 volts. This cell achieved very quick success in telegraphy, signalling and electric bell work.

The dry cell form was used to power early telephones—usually from an adjacent wooden box affixed to the wall—before telephones could draw power from the telephone line itself. The Leclanché cell could not provide a sustained current for very long; in lengthy conversations, the battery would run down, rendering the conversation inaudible. This is because certain chemical reactions in the cell increase its internal resistance and, thus, lower its voltage. These reactions reverse themselves when the battery is left idle, making it good for many short periods of use with idle time between them, but not long periods of use.

== Construction ==
The original form of the cell used a porous pot. This gave it a relatively high internal resistance, and various modifications were made to reduce the resistance. These included the "Agglomerate block cell" and the "Sack cell". Leclanché first, and Carl Gassner later, both strived to transform the original wet cell into a more portable and more efficient dry cell.

Porous pot cell
In Leclanché's original cell the depolarizer (in fact, the oxidizing agent in the cell), consisting of crushed manganese dioxide, is packed into a pot, and a carbon rod is inserted to act as the cathode (reduction reaction). The anode (oxidation reaction), which is a zinc rod, is then immersed along with the pot in a solution of ammonium chloride. The liquid solution acts as the electrolyte, permeating through the porous pot to make contact with the cathode.

Agglomerate block cell
In 1871 Leclanché dispensed with the porous pot and replaced it with a pair of "agglomerate blocks", attached to the carbon plate by rubber bands. These blocks were made by mixing the manganese dioxide with binding agents and pressing the mixture into moulds.

Sack cell
In this cell the porous pot is replaced by a wrapping of canvas or sacking. In addition, the zinc rod is replaced by a zinc cylinder to give a larger surface area. It has a lower internal resistance than either of the above (porous and agglomerate).

Starch addition
In 1876, Georges Leclanché added starch to the ammonium chloride electrolyte in an effort to better jellify it.

Improved dry cell
In 1888, a German physician, Carl Gassner, improved the jellification process and produced a more portable dry cell by mixing plaster and hydrophilic chemicals with the ammonium chloride electrolyte.

== Chemistry ==
The redox reaction in a Leclanché cell involves the two following half-reactions:

– anode (oxidation of Zn): Zn → Zn^{2+} + 2e^{−} | E^{0} = −0.76 volts

– cathode (reduction of Mn(IV)): 2 MnO_{2} + 2NH_{4}^{+} + 2e^{−} → 2 MnO(OH) + 2 NH_{3} | E^{0} = 1.23 volts

The chemical process which produces electricity in a Leclanché cell begins when zinc atoms on the surface of the anode oxidize, i.e. they give up both their valence electrons to become positively charged Zn^{2+} ions. As the Zn^{2+} ions move away from the anode, leaving their electrons on its surface, the anode becomes more negatively charged than the cathode. When the cell is connected in an external electrical circuit, the excess electrons on the zinc anode flow through the circuit to the carbon rod, the movement of electrons forming an electric current. The potential difference in charge over the anode and cathode is equal to the difference of the two half-reaction potentials, producing a theoretical voltage of 1.99v of potential energy across the terminals. A variety of factors, such as internal resistance, lower this output value to the 1.4 volts measured from these cells in practice.

As the current travels around the circuit, when the electrons enter the cathode (carbon rod), they combine with manganese dioxide (MnO_{2}) and water (H_{2}O), which react with each other to produce manganese oxide (Mn_{2}O_{3}) and negatively charged hydroxide ions. This is accompanied by a secondary acid-base reaction in which the hydroxide ions (OH^{–}) accept a proton (H^{+}) from the ammonium ions present in the ammonium chloride electrolyte to produce molecules of ammonia and water.

Zn(s) + 2 MnO_{2}(s) + 2 NH_{4}Cl(aq) → ZnCl_{2}(aq) + Mn_{2}O_{3}(s) + 2 NH_{3}(aq) + H_{2}O(l),

or if one also considers the hydration of the Mn_{2}O_{3}(s) sesquioxide into Mn(III) oxy-hydroxide:

Zn(s) + 2 MnO_{2}(s) + 2 NH_{4}Cl(aq) → ZnCl_{2}(aq) + 2 MnO(OH)(s) + 2 NH_{3}(aq)

Alternately, the reduction reaction of Mn(IV) can proceed further, forming Mn(II) hydroxide.

Zn(s) + MnO_{2}(s) + 2 NH_{4}Cl(aq) → ZnCl_{2}(aq) + Mn(OH)_{2}(s) + 2 NH_{3}(aq)

== Uses ==
The electromotive force (e.m.f.) produced by a Leclanche cell is 1.4 volts, with a resistance of several ohms where a porous pot is used. It saw extensive usage in telegraphy, signaling, electric bells and similar applications where intermittent current was required and it was desirable that a battery should require little maintenance.

The Leclanché battery wet cell was the forerunner of the modern zinc–carbon battery (a dry cell). The addition of zinc chloride to the electrolyte paste raises the e.m.f. to 1.5 volts. Later developments dispensed with the ammonium chloride completely, giving a cell that can endure more sustained discharge without its internal resistance rising as quickly (the zinc chloride cell).

== See also ==
- List of battery types
- History of the battery
- Alkaline battery, a similar cell in which the NH_{4}Cl electrolyte has been replaced by KOH. This improved type of battery with a much higher charge density (5 ×) was commercialised much later (1960/70).

== Bibliography ==
- Practical Electricity by W. E. Ayrton and T. Mather, published by Cassell and Company, London, 1911, pp 188–193
