= Zinc–carbon battery =

Type of dry cell battery

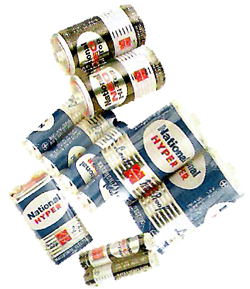
- Zinc–carbon batteries of various sizes
- Specific energy: 36 Wh/kg
- Energy density: 92 Wh/L
- Specific power: 10 W/kg–27 W/kg
- Charge/discharge efficiency: 50-60%
- Self-discharge rate: <0.32%/month
- Time durability: 3–5 years
- Nominal cell voltage: 1.5 V

A zinc–carbon battery (or carbon zinc battery) is a generic disposable battery. It is one of the earliest batteries made for consumer devices, and while it has been overtaken first by “heavy duty” zinc chloride versions, and in recent times by the longer-lasting alkaline and then lithium batteries, zinc-carbon remains useful as a cost-effective option for appliances with low power demand.

A zinc–carbon battery is a dry cell that provides direct electric current from the electrochemical reaction between zinc (Zn) and manganese dioxide (MnO_{2}) in the presence of an ammonium chloride (NH_{4}Cl) electrolyte. It produces a voltage of about 1.5 volts between the zinc anode, which is typically constructed as a cylindrical container for the battery cell, and a carbon rod surrounded by a compound with a higher standard electrode potential (positive polarity), known as the cathode, that collects the current from the manganese dioxide electrode. The name "zinc–carbon" is slightly misleading as it implies that carbon is acting as the oxidizing agent rather than the manganese dioxide.

General-purpose batteries may use an acidic aqueous paste of ammonium chloride (NH_{4}Cl) as electrolyte, with some zinc chloride solution on a paper separator to act as what is known as a salt bridge. Heavy-duty types use a paste primarily composed of zinc chloride (ZnCl_{2}).

Zinc–carbon batteries were the first commercial dry batteries, developed from the technology of the wet Leclanché cell. They made flashlights and other portable devices possible, because the battery provided a higher energy density at a lower cost than previously available cells. They are still useful in low-drain or intermittent-use devices such as remote controls, low-power flashlights, clocks or transistor radio, but perform poorly in devices such as high-lumen flashlights, digital cameras, and portable CD players.

== History ==
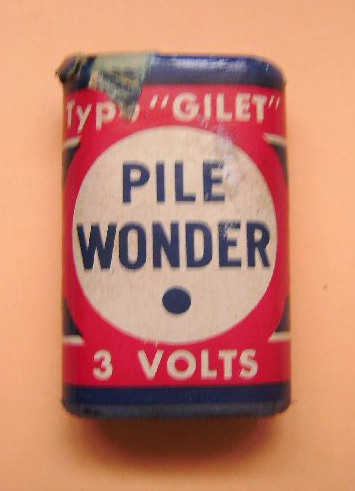
Old 3 V zinc–carbon battery (around 1960), with cardboard casing housing two cells in series

By 1876, the wet Leclanché cell was made with a compressed block of manganese dioxide. In 1886, Carl Gassner patented a "dry" version by using a casing made of zinc sheet metal as the anode and a paste of plaster of Paris (and later, graphite powder).

In 1898, Conrad Hubert used consumer batteries manufactured by W. H. Lawrence to power what was the first flashlight, and subsequently the two formed the Eveready Battery Company. In 1900, Gassner demonstrated dry cells for portable lighting at the World's Fair in Paris. Continual improvements were made to the stability and capacity of zinc–carbon cells throughout the 20th century; by the end of the century the capacities had increased fourfold over the 1910 equivalent. Improvements include the use of purer grades of manganese dioxide, the addition of graphite powder to the manganese dioxide to lower internal resistance, better sealing, and purer zinc for the negative electrode. Zinc-chloride cells (usually marketed as "heavy duty" batteries) use a higher concentration of anolyte (or anode electrolyte) which is primarily composed of zinc chloride, which can produce a more consistent voltage output in high drain applications.

Side reactions between impurities in the zinc metal/zinc chloride anode, and the ammonium chloride electrolyte can increase the self-discharge rate and promote corrosion of the cell. Formerly, the zinc was coated with mercury (Hg) to form an amalgam, protecting it. Given that this is an environmental hazard, current production batteries no longer use mercury. Manufacturers must now use more highly purified zinc to prevent local action and self-discharge.

As of 2011, zinc–carbon batteries accounted for 20% of all portable batteries in the United Kingdom and 18% in the E.U.

== Construction ==
The container of the zinc–carbon dry cell is a zinc can (anode). The bottom and sides of the can contains a paper separator layer which is "impregnated" with ammonium chloride (NH_{4}Cl) along with a thickening agent to form an aqueous electrolyte paste. The paper separator prevents a short circuit from forming by protecting the zinc can from making contact with the cathode, which is a mixture of powdered carbon (usually graphite powder) and manganese (IV) oxide (MnO_{2}), which is packed around a carbon rod.

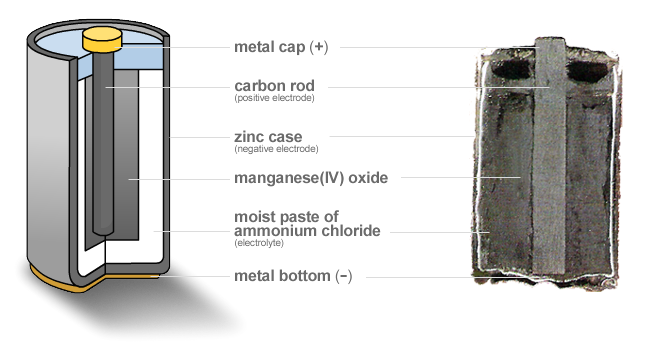
Cross-section of a zinc–carbon battery

Early types, and low-cost cells, use a separator consisting of a layer of starch or flour. A layer of starch-coated paper is used in modern cells, which is thinner and allows more manganese dioxide to be used. Originally cells were sealed with a layer of asphalt to prevent drying out of the electrolyte; more recently, a thermoplastic washer seal is used to help prevent leakage as well as to contain any internal pressure which may form as a result of hydrogen gas buildup during discharge. The carbon rod is slightly porous, which allows more charged hydrogen atoms to combine forming hydrogen gas. The ratio of manganese dioxide and carbon powder in the cathode paste affects the characteristics of the cell: more carbon powder lowers internal resistance, while more manganese dioxide improves storage capacity.

Flat cells are made for assembly into batteries with higher voltages, up to about 450 volts. Flat cells are stacked and the whole assembly is coated in wax to prevent electrolyte evaporation. Electrons flow from the anode to cathode through the wire of the attached device.

== Uses ==
Zinc–carbon batteries have a lower per unit cost and are often used as power for appliances that consume little energy, like remote controls for television, clocks, and smoke detectors, as well as fuzz pedals used with electric guitars. Zinc-carbon batteries were in common use with hand-cranked telephone magneto phones, powering the microphone and speaker.

== Chemical reactions ==
In a zinc–carbon dry cell, the outer zinc container is the negatively charged terminal.

=== Ammonium chloride electrolyte ===
The zinc is oxidised by the charge carrier, chloride anion (Cl^{−}) into ZnCl_{2}, via the following half-reactions:

Anode (oxidation reaction, marked −)

Zn + 2 Cl^{−} → ZnCl_{2} + 2 e^{−}

Cathode (reduction reaction, marked +)

2 MnO_{2} + 2 NH_{4}Cl + H_{2}O + 2 e^{−} → Mn_{2}O_{3} + 2 NH_{4}OH + 2 Cl^{−}

Other side reactions are possible, but the overall reaction in a zinc–carbon cell can be represented as

Zn + 2 MnO_{2} + 2 NH_{4}Cl + H_{2}O → ZnCl_{2} + Mn_{2}O_{3} + 2 NH_{4}OH

=== Zinc chloride electrolyte ===
If zinc chloride is substituted for ammonium chloride as the electrolyte, the anode reaction remains the same:

Zn + 2 Cl^{−} → ZnCl_{2} + 2 e^{−}

and the cathode reaction produces zinc hydroxide and manganese(III) oxide.

2 MnO_{2} + ZnCl_{2} + H_{2}O + 2 e^{−} → Mn_{2}O_{3} + Zn(OH)_{2} + 2 Cl^{−}

giving the overall reaction

Zn + 2 MnO_{2} + H_{2}O → Mn_{2}O_{3} + Zn(OH)_{2}

The battery has an electromotive force (emf.) of about 1.5V. The approximate nature of the emf is related to the complexity of the cathode reaction. The anode (zinc) reaction is comparatively simple with a known potential. Side reactions and depletion of the active chemicals increases the internal resistance of the battery, which causes the terminal voltage to drop under load.

== Zinc-chloride "heavy duty" cell ==
The zinc-chloride cell, frequently referred to as a heavy-duty, extra-heavy-duty, super-heavy-duty, or super-extra-heavy-duty battery, is an improvement on the original zinc–carbon cell, using purer chemicals and giving a longer service life and steadier voltage output as it is used and offering about twice the service life of general-purpose zinc–carbon cells, or up to four times in continuous-use or high-drain applications. This is still a fraction of the output of an alkaline cell, however.

Alkaline batteries offer up to eight times the battery life of zinc–carbon batteries, especially in continuous-use or high-drain applications.

== Storage ==
Manufacturers recommend storage of zinc–carbon batteries at room temperature; storage at higher temperatures reduces the expected service life. Zinc–carbon batteries may be frozen without damage; manufacturers recommend that they be returned to normal room temperature before use, and that condensation on the battery jacket must be avoided. By the end of the 20th century, the storage life of zinc–carbon cells had improved fourfold over expected life in 1910.

== Durability ==
Zinc–carbon cells have a short shelf life, as the zinc is attacked by ammonium chloride. The zinc container becomes thinner as the cell is used, because zinc metal is oxidized to zinc ions. When the zinc case thins enough, zinc chloride begins to leak out of the battery. The old dry cell is not leak-proof and becomes very sticky as the paste leaks through the holes in the zinc case. The zinc casing in the dry cell gets thinner even when the cell is not being used, because the ammonium chloride inside the battery reacts with the zinc. An "inside-out" form with a carbon cup and zinc vanes on the interior, while more leak-resistant, has not been manufactured since the 1960s.

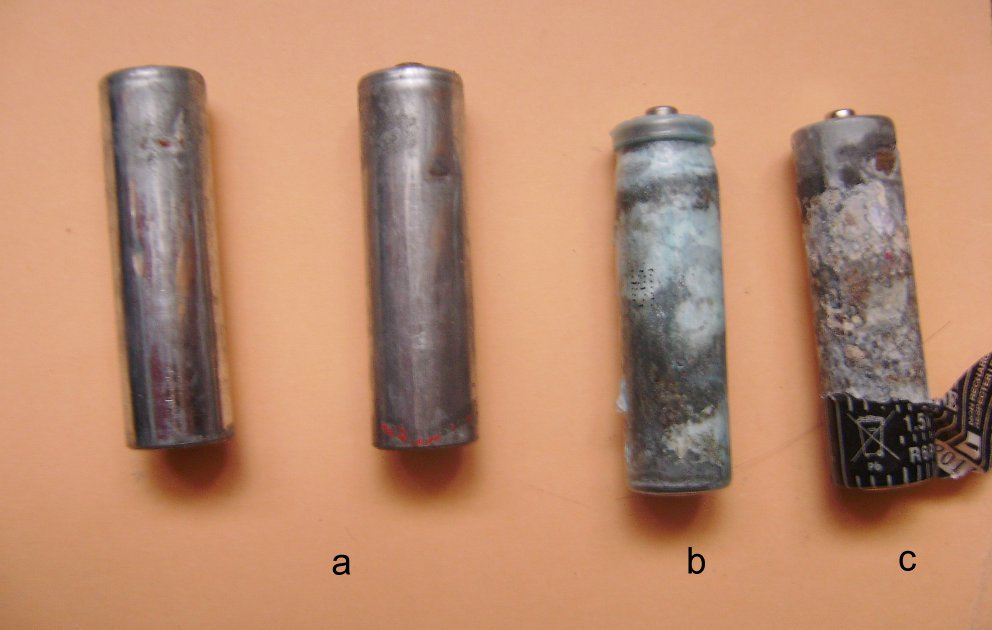
Progressive corrosion of zinc–carbon batteries

This picture shows the zinc container of fresh batteries at (a), and discharged batteries at (b) and (c). The battery shown at (c) had a polyethylene protection film (mostly removed in the photo) to keep the zinc oxide inside the casing.

== Environmental impact ==
Disposal varies by jurisdiction. For example, in the U.S., the state of California considers all batteries as hazardous waste when discarded, and has banned the disposal of batteries with other domestic waste. In Europe, battery disposal is controlled by the WEEE Directive and Battery Directive regulations, and as such zinc–carbon batteries must not be thrown out with domestic waste. In the EU, most stores that sell batteries are required by law to accept old batteries for recycling.

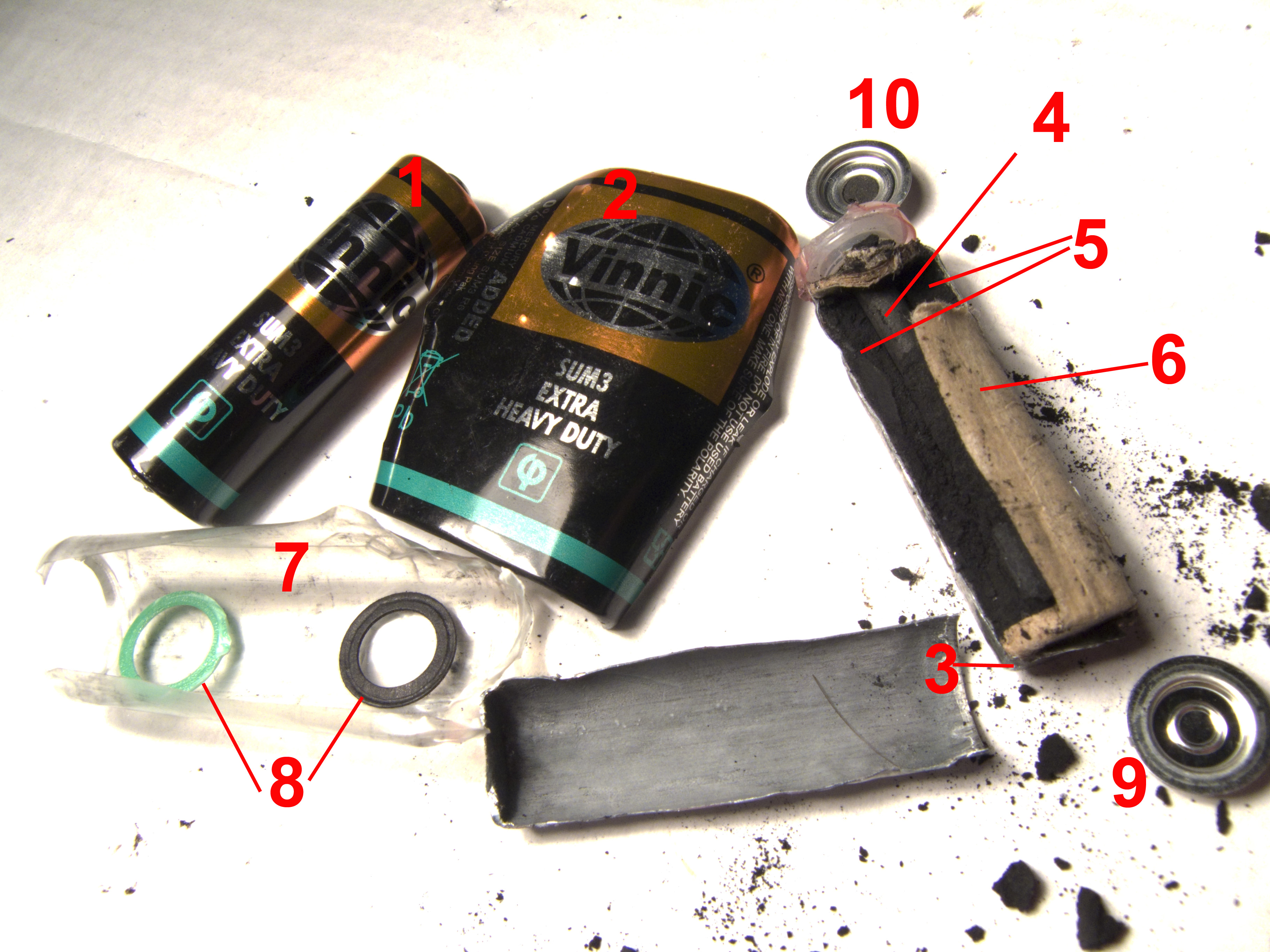
Disassembled zinc chloride cell (similar to zinc carbon cell). 1: entire cell, 2: steel casing, 3: zinc negative electrode, 4: carbon rod, 5: positive electrode (manganese dioxide mixed with carbon powder and electrolyte), 6: paper separator, 7: polyethylene leak proof isolation, 8: sealing rings, 9: negative terminal, 10: positive terminal (originally connected to carbon rod).

== See also ==
- Comparison of battery types
- List of battery sizes
- List of battery types
- Photoflash battery
