= Ammonium chloride =

- NH^{+}_{4}Cl^{−}
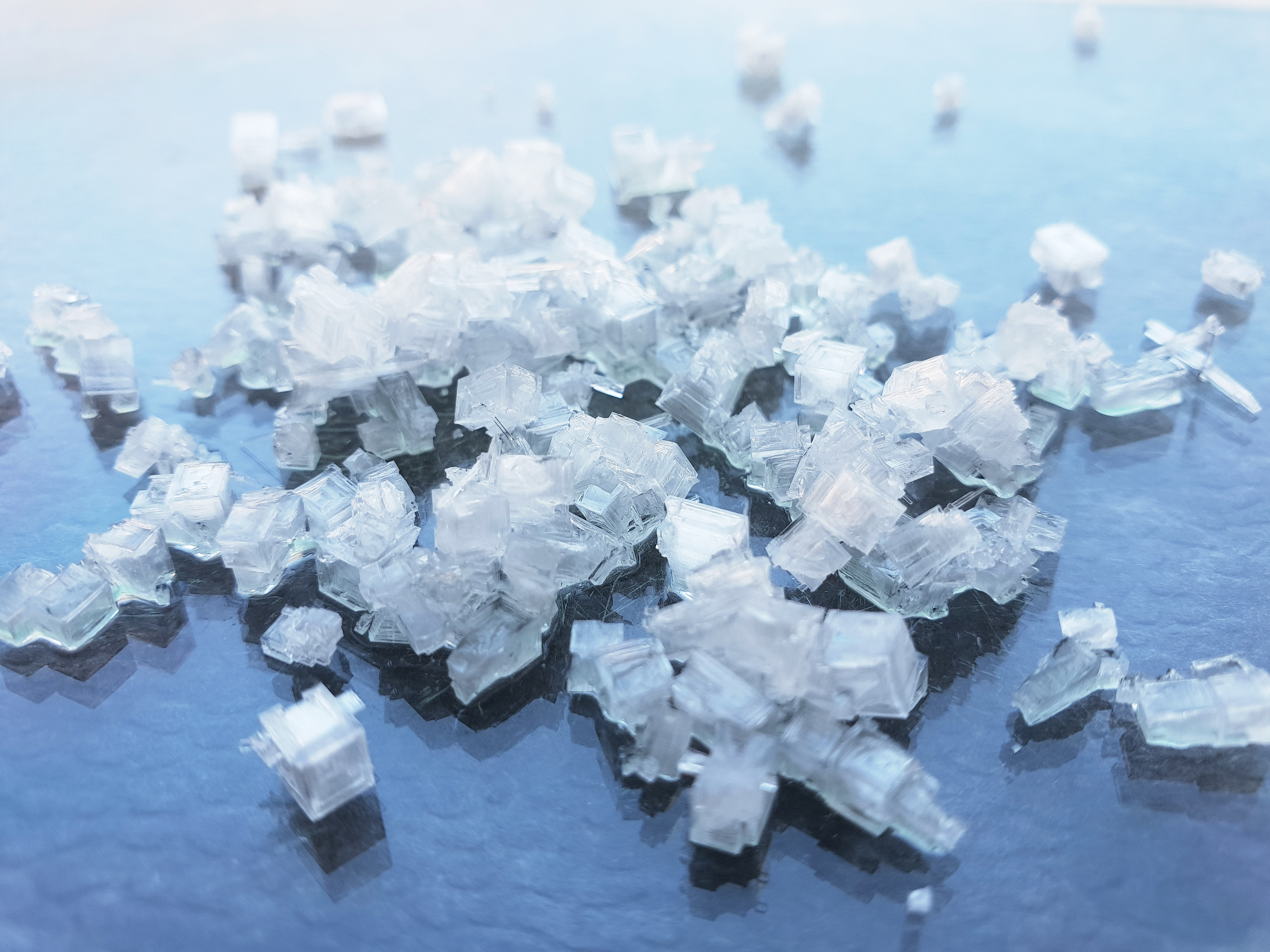
- Crystalline ammonium chloride

Names
- IUPAC name Ammonium chloride
- Other names: Sal ammoniac; Salmiac; Nushadir salt; Sal armagnac; Ammonium Muriate; Amchlor; Salt armoniack; Salmiak; Nishadal; muriate of ammonia

Identifiers
CAS Number	12125-02-9
3D model (JSmol)	Interactive image
ChEBI	CHEBI:31206
ChemSpider	23807
ECHA InfoCard	100.031.976
EC Number	235-186-4
KEGG	D01139
PubChem CID	25517
RTECS number	BP4550000
UNII	01Q9PC255D
UN number	3077
CompTox Dashboard (EPA)	DTXSID0020078
- InChI: InChI=1S/ClH.H3N/h1H;1H3 Key: NLXLAEXVIDQMFP-UHFFFAOYSA-N; InChI=1/ClH.H3N/h1H;1H3 Key: NLXLAEXVIDQMFP-UHFFFAOYAI
- SMILES: [Cl-].[NH4+]

Properties
Chemical formula	NH_{4}Cl
Molar mass	53.49 g·mol^{−1}
Appearance	White or colorless crystalline solid, hygroscopic
Odor	Odorless
Density	1.519 g/cm^{3}
Melting point	338 °C (640 °F)
Sublimation conditions	Decomposes at 337.6 °C at 1 atm Δ_{decomp}H^{~~o~~} = 176.1 kJ/mol
Solubility in water	244 g/L (−15 °C); 294 g/L (0 °C); 383.0 g/L (25 °C); 454.4 g/L (40 °C); 740.8 g/L (100 °C)
Solubility product (K_{sp})	30.9 (395 g/L)
Solubility	Soluble in liquid ammonia, hydrazine, Slightly soluble in acetone Insoluble in diethyl ether, ethyl acetate
Solubility in methanol	32 g/kg (17 °C); 33.5 g/kg (19 °C); 35.4 g/kg (25 °C)
Solubility in ethanol	6 g/L (19 °C)
Solubility in glycerol	97 g/kg
Solubility in sulfur dioxide	0.09 g/kg (0 °C); 0.031 g/kg (25 °C)
Solubility in acetic acid	0.67 g/kg (16.6 °C)
Vapor pressure	133.3 Pa (160.4 °C); 6.5 kPa (250 °C); 33.5 kPa (300 °C)
Acidity (pK_{a})	9.24
Magnetic susceptibility (χ)	−36.7·10^{−6} cm^{3}/mol
Refractive index (n_{D})	1.642 (20 °C)

Structure
Crystal structure	CsCl, cP2
Space group	Pm3̅m, No. 221
Lattice constant	a = 0.3876 nm
Formula units (Z)	1

Thermochemistry
Heat capacity (C)	84.1 J/mol·K
Std molar entropy (S^{⦵}_{298})	94.56 J/mol·K
Std enthalpy of formation (Δ_{f}H^{⦵}_{298})	−314.43 kJ/mol
Gibbs free energy (Δ_{f}G^{⦵})	−202.97 kJ/mol

Pharmacology
ATC code	B05XA04 (WHO) G04BA01 (WHO)

Hazards
- GHS labelling
Pictograms	(GHS07: Exclamation mark)
Signal word	Warning
Hazard statements	H302, H319
Precautionary statements	P305+P351+P338
NFPA 704 (fire diamond)	2 0 0
Flash point	Non-flammable
- Lethal dose or concentration (LD, LC)
LD_{50} (median dose)	1650 mg/kg (rats, oral)
- NIOSH (US health exposure limits)
PEL (Permissible)	none
REL (Recommended)	TWA 10 mg/m^{3} ST 20 mg/m^{3} (as fume)
IDLH (Immediate danger)	N.D.
Safety data sheet (SDS)	ICSC 1051

Related compounds
Other anions	Ammonium fluoride Ammonium bromide Ammonium iodide
Other cations	Sodium chloride Potassium chloride Hydroxylammonium chloride
- Except where otherwise noted, data are given for materials in their standard state (at 25 °C [77 °F], 100 kPa). verify (what is ?) Infobox references

Ammonium chloride is an inorganic chemical compound with the chemical formula NH_{4}Cl, also written as [NH_{4}]Cl. It is an ammonium salt of chloride. It consists of ammonium cations [NH_{4}]^{+} and chloride anions Cl^{−}. It is a white crystalline salt that is highly soluble in water. Solutions of ammonium chloride are mildly acidic. In its naturally occurring mineralogic form, it is known as salammoniac. The mineral is commonly formed on burning coal dumps from condensation of coal-derived gases. It is also found around some types of volcanic vents. It is mainly used as fertilizer and a food additive. It is a product of the reaction of hydrochloric acid and ammonia.

== Structure ==
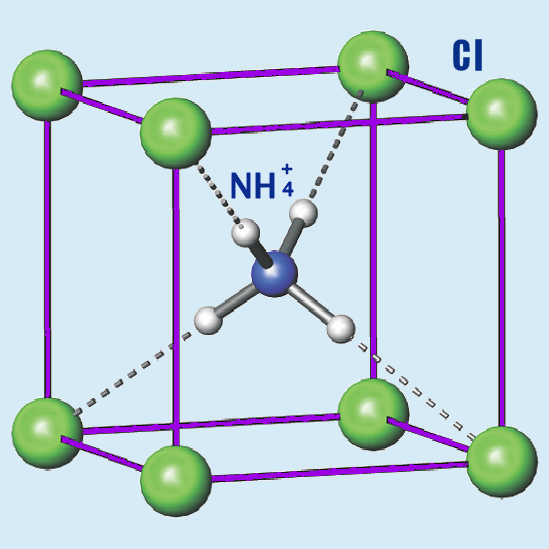
unit cell of a common form of solid ammonium chloride

Ammonium chloride is a salt that crystallizes in a motif akin those for the alkali metal chlorides. At least three phases have been characterized. According to X-ray crystallography, these phases include ordered and disordered variants of the sodium chloride and cesium chloride structures. In the NaCl structure, which is found at room temperature and 1 atmosphere, tetrahedral ammonium cations hydrogen bond to four of the eight chloride anions that encase the cation.

Ammonium chloride melts reversibly in a normal way near 500 °C but only under pressure.

When dissolved, the lattice disassembles into separate chloride and ammonium cations. At neutral pH, the N-H bonds rapidly exchange with water.

== Production ==
Formation of ammonium chloride from ammonia and hydrogen chloride, respectively released from aqueous ammonia and hydrochloric acid.

It is a product of the Solvay process used to produce sodium carbonate:

CO_{2} + 2 NH_{3} + 2 NaCl + H_{2}O → 2 NH_{4}Cl + Na_{2}CO_{3}

Not only is that method the principal one for the manufacture of ammonium chloride, but also it is used to minimize ammonia release in some industrial operations.

Ammonium chloride is prepared commercially by combining ammonia (NH_{3}) with either hydrogen chloride (gas) or hydrochloric acid:

NH_{3} + HCl → NH_{4}Cl

Ammonium chloride occurs naturally in volcanic regions, appearing as a sublimate on rocks near fume-releasing vents (fumaroles). The crystals deposit directly from the gaseous state and tend to be short-lived, as they dissolve easily in water.

== Reactions ==
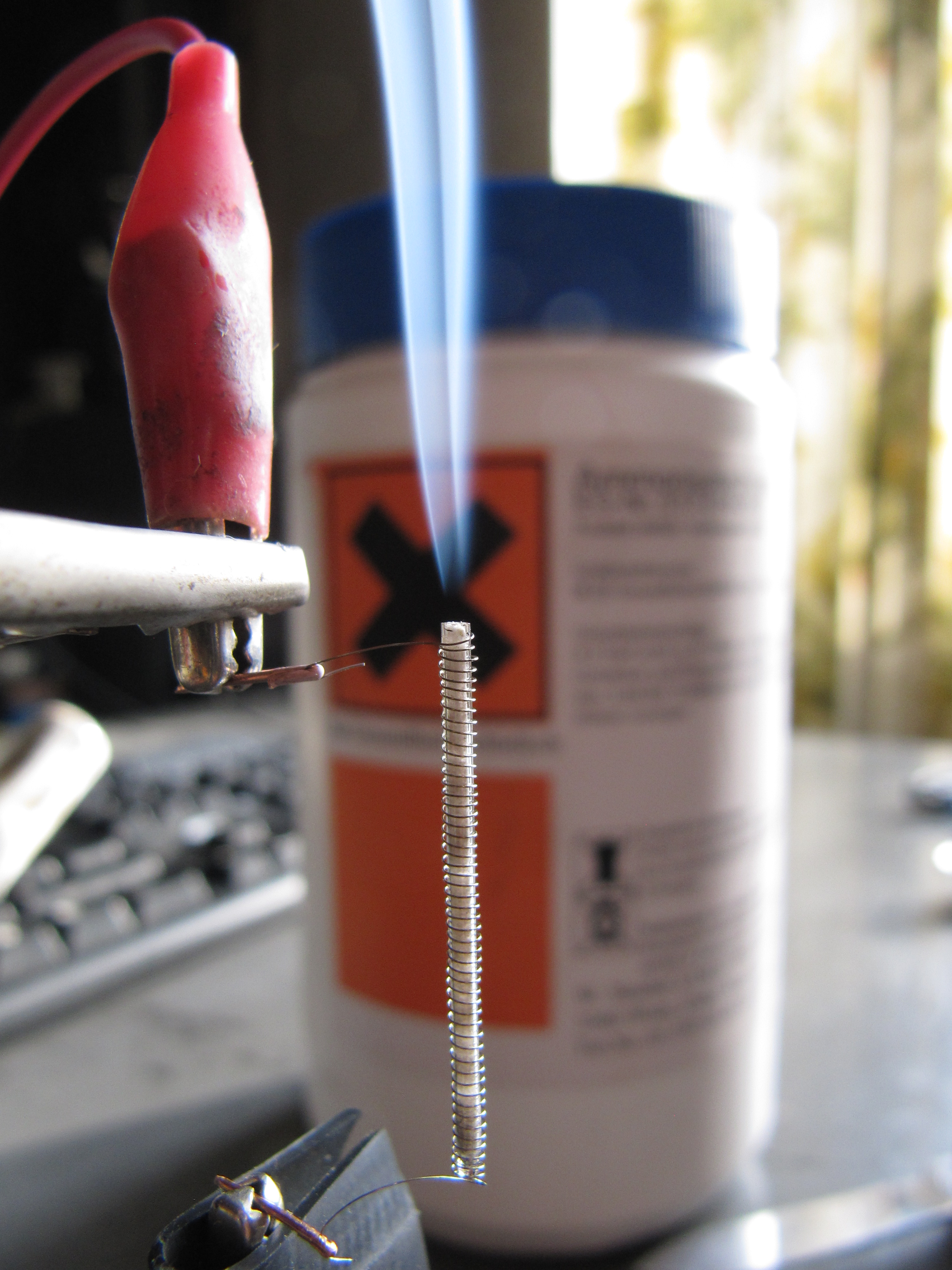
Ammonium chloride pyrolyses and reforms into ammonium-chloride smoke after cooling.

Ammonium chloride sublimes upon heating, reversibly decomposing into ammonia and hydrogen chloride gas:

NH_{4}Cl ⇌ NH_{3} + HCl

Ammonium chloride reacts with a strong base, such as sodium hydroxide, to release ammonia:

NH_{4}Cl + NaOH → NH_{3} + NaCl + H_{2}O

Similarly, ammonium chloride also reacts with alkali-metal carbonates at elevated temperatures, giving ammonia and alkali-metal chloride:

2 NH_{4}Cl + Na_{2}CO_{3} → 2 NaCl + CO_{2} + H_{2}O + 2 NH_{3}

A solution of 5% by mass of ammonium chloride in water has a pH in the range 4.6 to 6.0.

== Applications ==
=== Agriculture ===
The dominant application of ammonium chloride is as a nitrogen source in fertilizers (corresponding to 90% of the world production of ammonium chloride) such as chloroammonium phosphate. The main crops fertilized this way are rice and wheat in Asia. When using ammonium chloride as a nitrogen fertilizer for plants, the appropriate concentration is applied to provide sufficient nutrients without causing harm. Ammonium chloride is approximately 26% nitrogen by weight and can be used to supply nitrogen to plants, especially those preferring slightly acidic conditions. The concentration for nitrogen fertilization in solution is between 50 and 100 milligrams of nitrogen per liter of water (mg N/L), which is equivalent to 50–100 parts per million (ppm) nitrogen, which translates to approximately 0.2 to 0.4 grams of ammonium chloride per liter of water. Ammonium chloride can acidify the soil over time, so soil pH is regularly monitored, especially when growing plants sensitive to acidic conditions. Some plants are sensitive to chloride ions (e.g., avocados, beans, grapes), so applying ammonium chloride to such plants should be done with extra caution to prevent chloride toxicity. While ammonium chloride can be beneficial as a nitrogen source, improper use can harm plants and the environment.

Ammonium chloride solutions are generally stable and can be stored for a certain period if kept under appropriate conditions, that is in airtight containers (to prevent contamination, evaporation and hydrolysis), away from light (to prevent photodegradation) and heat sources (to reduce microbial growth and chemical degradation), and if contamination is prevented. In agricultural applications the solution is used shortly after preparation, for the following reasons:

1. Nutrient-rich solutions can promote the growth of microorganisms over time, so that microbial activity can alter the chemical composition of the solution, potentially reducing its efficacy as a fertilizer and introducing pathogens to plants.
2. Over time, water can evaporate from the solution, especially if not stored in a tightly sealed container, which increases the concentration of ammonium chloride, and may lead to over-fertilization and potential damage to plants when applied.
3. While ammonium chloride is relatively stable, prolonged storage may lead to minor changes in pH due to ongoing hydrolysis, especially if the solution is exposed to air, potentially impacting plants sensitive to acidity of the soil.
4. If the water used is not distilled or deionized, dissolved minerals and impurities may precipitate over time, altering the nutrient balance of the solution.

=== Pyrotechnics ===
Ammonium chloride was used in pyrotechnics in the 18th century but was superseded by safer and less hygroscopic chemicals. Its purpose was to provide a chlorine donor to enhance the green and blue colours from copper ions in the flame.

It had a secondary use to provide white smoke, but its ready double decomposition reaction with potassium chlorate producing the highly unstable ammonium chlorate made its use very dangerous.

=== Metalwork ===
Ammonium chloride is used as a flux in preparing metals to be tin coated, galvanized or soldered. It works as a flux by cleaning the surface of workpieces by reacting with the metal oxides at the surface to form a volatile metal chloride. For that purpose, it is sold in blocks at hardware stores for use in cleaning the tip of a soldering iron, and it can also be included in solder as flux.

=== Medicine ===
Ammonium chloride is used as an expectorant in cough medicine. Its expectorant action is caused by irritative action on the bronchial mucosa, which causes the production of excess respiratory tract fluid, which presumably is easier to cough up. Ammonium salts are an irritant to the gastric mucosa and may induce nausea and vomiting.

Ammonium chloride is used as a systemic acidifying agent in treatment of severe metabolic alkalosis, in oral acid loading test to diagnose distal renal tubular acidosis, to maintain the urine at an acid pH in the treatment of some urinary-tract disorders.

=== Food ===
Ammonium chloride, under the name sal ammoniac or salmiak is used as food additive under the E number E510, working as a yeast nutrient in breadmaking and as an acidifier. It is a feed supplement for cattle and an ingredient in nutritive media for yeasts and many microorganisms.

Ammonium chloride is used in baking to give cookies a very crisp texture, to spice up dark sweets called salty liquorice (popular in the Nordic countries, Benelux and northern Germany), and in the liquor Salmiakki Koskenkorva for flavouring. In Turkey, Iran, Tajikistan, India, Pakistan and Arab countries it is called "noshader" and is used to improve the crispness of snacks such as samosas and jalebi.

=== In the laboratory ===
Ammonium chloride has been used historically to produce low temperatures in cooling baths.

Ammonium chloride solutions with ammonia are used as buffer solutions including ACK (Ammonium-Chloride-Potassium) lysis buffer.

In paleontology, ammonium chloride vapor is deposited on fossils, where the substance forms a brilliant white, easily removed and fairly harmless and inert layer of tiny crystals that covers up any coloration the fossil may have, and if lighted at an angle highly enhances contrast in photographic documentation of three-dimensional specimens. The same technique is applied in archaeology to eliminate reflection on glass and similar specimens for photography.

In organic synthesis saturated NH_{4}Cl solution is typically used to quench reaction mixtures.

It has a lambda transition at 242.8 K and zero pressure.

=== Flotation ===
Giant squid and some other large squid species maintain neutral buoyancy in seawater through an ammonium chloride solution which is found throughout their bodies and is less dense than seawater. This differs from the method of flotation used by most fish, which involves a gas-filled swim bladder.

=== Batteries ===
Around the turn of the 20th century, ammonium chloride was used in aqueous solution as the electrolyte in Leclanché cells that found a commercial use as the "local battery" in subscribers' telephone installations. Those cells later evolved into zinc–carbon batteries, which still use ammonium chloride as an electrolyte.

=== Concrete treatments ===
Ammonium chloride is known to be an aggressive cleaning agent.

A penetrating and intense reddish brown color is stained into concrete surfaces with a mixture of ammonium chloride and ferric chloride. Pre-treatment with acid is unnecessary.

=== Photography ===
Ammonium chloride can also be used in the process of making albumen silver prints, commonly known as albumen prints. In traditional photographic printing processes of the 19th century, ammonium chloride served as a key component in preparing the albumen solution used to coat the photographic paper. Albumen printing was the dominant photographic printing technique from the 1850s through the 1890s, prized for its fine detail and rich tonal rendition. The incorporation of ammonium chloride in the albumen solution was a significant factor in the quality and popularity of this photographic process. The process involves mixing egg whites (albumen) with ammonium chloride to create a viscous solution. This mixture is then applied as a thin layer onto paper, which, after drying, forms a smooth and glossy surface. Ammonium chloride acts as a salting agent, contributing chloride ions that are essential for forming light-sensitive silver chloride when the coated paper is subsequently sensitized with a solution of silver nitrate. Upon exposure to light, the silver chloride reduces to metallic silver, creating a visible image. The use of ammonium chloride, as opposed to sodium chloride (common salt), can influence the contrast and tonal range of the final print, often yielding warmer tones and greater image clarity.

=== Other applications ===
Ammonium chloride is used in a ~5% aqueous solution to work on oil wells with clay swelling problems. Other uses include in hair shampoo, in the glue that bonds plywood, and in cleaning products. In hair shampoo, it is used as a thickening agent in ammonium-based surfactant systems such as ammonium lauryl sulfate. Ammonium chloride is used in the textile and leather industry, in dyeing, tanning, textile printing and cotton clustering. In woodworking, a solution of ammonium chloride and water, when applied to unfinished wood, will burn when subjected to a heat gun resulting in a branding iron mark without use of a branding iron. The solution can be painted onto the wood or applied with a common rubber stamp.

== History ==
=== Etymology ===
It was in deposits near the temple of Ammon in Siwa that the Romans extracted ammonium chloride, which they called sal ammoniacus (Ammonian Salt) in honor of the Siwan Berber god Ammon. Sal ammoniacus is itself borrowed from the ancient Greek ammoniakos, which meant 'relating to Ammon'.

Pliny, in Book XXXI of his Natural History, refers to a salt produced in the Roman province of Cyrenaica named hammoniacum, so called because of its proximity to the nearby Temple of Jupiter Amun (Greek Ἄμμων Ammon). However, the description Pliny gives of the salt does not conform to the properties of ammonium chloride. According to Herbert Hoover's commentary in his English translation of Georgius Agricola's De re metallica, it is likely to have been common sea salt. Nevertheless, that salt ultimately gave ammonia and ammonium compounds their name.

=== Ancient China ===
The earliest mention of ammonium chloride was in 554 in China. At that time, ammonium chloride came from two sources: (1) the vents of underground coal fires in Central Asia, specifically, in the Tian Shan mountains (which extend from Xinjiang province of northwestern China through Kyrgyzstan) as well as in the Alay (or Alai) mountains of southwestern Kyrgyzstan, and (2) the fumaroles of the volcano Mount Taftan in southeastern Iran. (Indeed, the word for ammonium chloride in several Asian languages derives from the Iranian phrase anosh adur (immortal fire), a reference to the underground fires.) Ammonium chloride was then transported along the Silk Road eastwards to China and westwards to the Muslim lands and Europe.

=== Jabirian alchemists ===
Around 800 A.D. the Persian chemist Jabir ibn Hayyan discovered ammonium chloride in the soot that resulted from burning camel dung, and this source became an alternative to those in Central Asia.

The Jabirian alchemists were the authors of the Jabirian corpus, tentatively dated to c. 850 – c. 950. The word for ammonium chloride in the Jabirian corpus was nošāder, Arabian in origin. Whereas Greek alchemical texts had been almost exclusively focused on the use of mineral substances, Jabirian alchemy pioneered the use of vegetable and animal substances, and so represented an innovative shift towards 'organic chemistry'. In the Jabirian corpus, the production of ammonium chloride from organic substances (such as plants, blood, and hair) is described. These are the oldest known instructions for deriving an inorganic compound from organic substances by chemical means.

One of the innovations in Jabirian alchemy was the addition of ammonium chloride to the category of chemical substances known as 'spirits' (i.e., strongly volatile substances). This included both naturally occurring sal ammoniac and synthetic ammonium chloride produced from organic substances. The addition of sal ammoniac to the list of 'spirits' can perhaps also be seen as a product of this new focus on organic chemistry.

=== Late Middle Ages ===
The first attested reference to sal ammoniac as ammonium chloride is in the Pseudo-Geber work De inventione veritatis, where a preparation of sal ammoniac is given in the chapter De Salis ammoniaci præparatione, sal ammoniacus (genitive: salis ammoniaci) being a common name in Latin of the Middle Ages for sal ammoniac.

== Bibliography ==
- Bischof, Gustav with Benjamin H. Paul and J. Drummond, trans. (1854). Elements of Chemical and Physical Geology. Vol. 1. London, England: the Cavendish Society.
- Delva, Thijs (2017). "The Abbasid Activist Ḥayyān al-ʿAṭṭār as the Father of Jābir b. Ḥayyān: An Influential Hypothesis Revisited". Journal of Abbasid Studies. 4 (1): 35–61. doi:10.1163/22142371-12340030.
- Forster, Regula (2018). "Jābir b. Ḥayyān". In Fleet, Kate; Krämer, Gudrun; Matringe, Denis; Nawas, John; Rowson, Everett (eds.). Encyclopaedia of Islam, Three. doi:10.1163/1573-3912_ei3_COM_32665.
- Kraus, Paul (1942–1943). Jâbir ibn Hayyân: Contribution à l'histoire des idées scientifiques dans l'Islam. I. Le corpus des écrits jâbiriens. II. Jâbir et la science grecque. Cairo: Institut Français d'Archéologie Orientale. ISBN 978-3-487-09115-0. OCLC 468740510.
- Needham, Joseph; Ho Ping-Yü; Lu Gwei-Djen; Sivin, Nathan (1980). Science and Civilization in China. Vol. 5: Chemistry and Chemical Technology, Part IV: Spagyrical discovery and invention: apparatus, theories and gifts. Cambridge, England: Cambridge University Press. ISBN 978-0521086905.
- Nomanul Haq, Syed (1994). Names, Natures and Things: The Alchemist Jābir ibn Ḥayyān and his Kitāb al-Aḥjār (Book of Stones). Dordrecht: Kluwer. ISBN 9789401118989.
- Ruska, Julius (1923a). "Sal ammoniacus, Nušādir und Salmiak". Sitzungsberichte der Heidelberger Akademie der Wissenschaften, Philosophisch-Historische Klasse. 14 (5). doi:10.11588/diglit.38046.
- Ruska, Julius (1928). "Der Salmiak in der Geschichte der Alchemie". Zeitschrift für angewandte Chemie. 41 (50): 1321–1324. Bibcode:1928AngCh..41.1321R. doi:10.1002/ange.19280415006.
- Sezgin, Fuat (1971). Geschichte des arabischen Schrifttums, Band IV: Alchimie, Chemie, Botanik, Agrikultur bis ca. 430 H. Leiden: Brill. pp. 132–269. ISBN 9789004020092.
- Stapleton, Henry E.; Azo, R.F.; Hidayat Husain, M. (1927). "Chemistry in Iraq and Persia in the Tenth Century A.D." Memoirs of the Asiatic Society of Bengal. VIII (6): 317–418. OCLC 706947607.
- Sutton, M. A; Erisman, J. W; Dentener, F; Möller, D (2008). "Ammonia in the environment: From ancient times to the present". Environmental Pollution. 156 (3): 583–604. Bibcode:2008EPoll.156..583S. doi:10.1016/j.envpol.2008.03.013. PMID 18499318.
