= International System of Electrical and Magnetic Units =

The International System of Electrical and Magnetic Units is an obsolete system of units used for measuring electrical and magnetic quantities. It was proposed as a system of practical international units (e.g., the international ampere, the international ohm, the international volt) by unanimous recommendation at the International Electrical Congress (Chicago, 1893), discussed at other Congresses, and finally adopted at the International Conference on Electric Units and Standards in London in 1908. It was rendered obsolete by the inclusion of electromagnetic units in the International System of Units (SI) at the 9th General Conference on Weights and Measures in 1948.

== Earlier systems ==
The link between electromagnetic units and the more familiar units of length, mass and time was first demonstrated by Carl Friedrich Gauss in 1832 with his measurement of the Earth's magnetic field, and the principle was extended to electrical measurements by Franz Ernst Neumann in 1845. A complete system of metric electrical and magnetic units was proposed by Wilhelm Eduard Weber in 1851, based on the idea that electrical units could be defined solely in relation to absolute units of length, mass, and time. Weber's original proposal was based on a millimetre–milligram–second system of units.

The development of the electric telegraph (an invention of Gauss and Weber) demonstrated the need for accurate electrical measurements. At the behest of William Thomson, the British Association for the Advancement of Science (B.A.) set up a committee in 1861, initially to examine standards for electrical resistance, which was expanded in 1862 to include other electrical standards. After two years of discussion, experiment and considerable differences of opinion, the committee decided to adapt Weber's approach to the CGS system of units, but used metre, gramme and second as their absolute units. However these units were both difficult to realize and (often) impractically small. To overcome these handicaps, the B.A. also proposed a set of "practical" or "reproduceable" units, which were not directly linked to the CGS system but which were, as near as experimental accuracy allowed, equal to multiples of the corresponding CGS units. The B.A. had developed two sets of CGS units. The practical units were based on the electromagnetic set of units rather than the electrostatic set.

== 1893 system ==
The B.A. system of practical units gained considerable international support, and was adopted – with one important modification – by the First International Conference of Electricians (Paris, 1881). The British Association had constructed an artefact representation of the ohm (a standard length of resistance wire which had a resistance of 10^{9} CGS units of electric resistance, that is one ohm) whereas the international conference preferred a method of realization that could be repeated in different laboratories in different countries. The chosen method was based on the resistivity of mercury, by measuring the resistance of a column of mercury of specified dimensions (106 cm × 1 mm^{2}): however, the chosen length of column was almost 3 millimetres too short, leading to a difference of 0.28% between the new practical units and the CGS units which were supposedly their basis.

The anomaly was resolved at another international conference, in Chicago in 1893, by a correction in the definition of the ohm. The units agreed at this conference were termed "international" units, to distinguish them from their predecessors.

The 1893 system had three base units: the international ampere, the international ohm and the international volt.

Unit	1893 ("international") definition (Note: The terminology of some of the definitions has been updated to modern usage.)	CGS ("absolute") equivalent	Notes
international ampere	The unvarying current which, when passed through a solution of silver nitrate in water, deposits silver at the rate of 0.001 118 00 grams per second	The current produced in a conductor with a 1 ohm resistance when there is a potential difference of 1 volt between its ends	0.1 CGS-EMU units of electric current
international ohm	The resistance offered to an unvarying electric current by a column of mercury at the temperature of melting ice 14.4521 grams in mass, of a constant cross-sectional area and of the length of 106.3 centimetres		10^{9} CGS-EMU units of electric resistance
international volt	1000/1434 of the electromotive force of a Clark cell at a temperature of 15 °C	The electromotive force produced in an electric circuit which cuts 10^{8} magnetic lines of force per second	10^{8} CGS-EMU units of electromotive force

The international units did not have the same formal legal status as the metre and the kilogram through the Metre Convention (1875), although several countries adopted the definition within their national laws (e.g., the United States, through Public Law 105 of July 12, 1894).

== Overdefinition and the 1908 modification ==
The 1893 system of units was overdefined, as can be seen from an examination of Ohm's law:

V = IR.

By Ohm's law, knowing any two of the physical quantities V, I or R (potential difference, current or resistance) will define the third, and yet the 1893 system defines the units for all three quantities. With improvements in measurement techniques, it was soon recognised that

1 V_{int} ≠ 1 A_{int} × 1 Ω_{int}.

The solution came at an international conference in London in 1908. The essential point was to reduce the number of base units from three to two by redefining the international volt as a derived unit. There were several other modifications of less practical importance:

- the international ampere and the international ohm were formally defined in terms of the corresponding CGS electromagnetic units, with the 1893 definitions retained as preferred realizations;
- the preferred realization of the international volt was in terms of the electromotive force of a Weston cell at 20 °C (1.0184 V_{int}), as this type of cell has a lower temperature coefficient than the Clark cell;
- several other derived units for use in electrical and magnetic measurements were formally defined:

International coulomb
the electric charge transferred by a current of one international ampere in one second; (Note: The coulomb and the farad had been used in earlier B.A. systems of electrical units with slightly different definitions, hence the need to add the qualifier "international".)
International farad
the capacitance of a capacitor charged to a potential of one international volt by one international coulomb of electricity;
Joule
10^{7} units of work in the CGS system, represented sufficiently well for practical use by the energy expended in one second by an international ampere in an international ohm;
Watt
10^{7} units of power in the CGS system, represented sufficiently well for practical use by the work done at the rate of one joule per second;
Henry
the inductance in a circuit when an electromotive force induced in this circuit is one international volt, while the inducing current varies at the rate of one ampere per second.

== SI units ==
With advances in the theory of electromagnetism and in quantity calculus, it became apparent that, in addition to the base units of time, length and mass, a coherent system of units could include only one electromagnetic base unit. The first such system was proposed by Giorgi in 1901: it used the ohm as the additional base unit in the MKS system, and so is often referred to as the MKSΩ system or the Giorgi system.

An additional problem with the CGS system of electrical units, pointed out as early as 1882 by Oliver Heaviside, was that they were not "rationalized", that is they failed to properly take account of permittivity and permeability as properties of a medium. Giorgi was also a great proponent of rationalization of the electrical units.

The choice of electrical unit for the base unit in a rationalized system depends only on practical considerations, particularly the ability to realize the unit accurately and reproducibly. The ampere rapidly gained support over the ohm, as many national standards laboratories were already realizing the ampere in absolute terms using ampere balances. The International Electrotechnical Commission (IEC) adopted the Giorgi system with the ampere replacing the ohm in 1935, and this choice of base units is often called the MKSA system.

The International Committee for Weights and Measures (CIPM) approved a new set of definitions for electrical units, based on the rationalized MKSA system, in 1946, and these were internationally adopted under the Metre Convention by the 9th General Conference on Weights and Measures in 1948. Under this system, which would become the International System of Units (SI), the ohm is a derived unit. (Note: The ohm is the electric resistance between two points of a conductor when a constant potential difference of 1 volt, applied to these points, produces in the conductor a current of 1 ampere, the conductor not being the seat of any electromotive force.)

The SI definitions of the electrical units are formally equivalent to the 1908 international definitions, and so there should not have been any change in the size of the units. Nevertheless, the international ohm and the international volt were not usually realized in absolute terms but by reference to a standard resistance and a standard electromotive force respectively. The realizations recommended in 1908 are not exactly equivalent to the absolute definitions: recommended conversion factors are

1 Ω_{int} ≈ 1.000 49 Ω
1 V_{int} ≈ 1.000 34 V

although slightly different factors may apply for individual standards in national measurement laboratories. (Note: Conversion factors for the U.S. national standards (NIST) are 1 Ω_{int} = 1.000 495 Ω and 1 V_{int} = 1.000 330 V.) As the international ampere was usually realized by means of an ampere balance rather than electrolytically, 1 A_{int} = 1 A. The conversion factor for the "electrolytic" ampere (A_{elec}) can be calculated from modern values of the atomic weight of silver and the Faraday constant:

1 A_{elec} = 1.000 022(2) A

== See also ==
- Conventional electrical units
