= Depolarizer =

Oxidizing agent sometimes used in batteries

A depolarizer or depolariser, in electrochemistry, according to an IUPAC definition, is a synonym of electroactive substance, i.e., a substance which changes its oxidation state, or partakes in a formation or breaking of chemical bonds, in a charge-transfer step of an electrochemical reaction.

In the battery industry, the term "depolarizer" has been used to denote a substance used in a primary cell to prevent buildup of hydrogen gas bubbles. A battery depolarizer takes up electrons during discharge of the cell; therefore, it is always an oxidizing agent. The term "depolarizer" can be considered as outdated or misleading, since it is based on the concept of "polarization" which is hardly realistic in many cases.

== Polarization ==
Under certain conditions for some electrochemical cells, especially if they use an aqueous electrolyte, hydrogen ions can be converted into hydrogen atoms and H_{2} molecules. In the extreme case, bubbles of hydrogen gas might appear at one of the electrodes. If such a layer of hydrogen or even H_{2} gas bubbles appear on the positive plate of a battery, they interfere with the chemical action of the cell. An electrode covered with gases is said to be polarized. Polarization in galvanic cells causes the voltage and thus current to be reduced, especially if the bubbles cover a large fraction of a plate. Depolarizers are substances which are intended to remove the hydrogen, and therefore, they help to keep the voltage at a high level. However, this concept is outdated, since if enough depolarizer is present, it will react directly in most cases by getting electrons from the positive plate of the galvanic cell, i.e. there will be no relevant amount of hydrogen gas present. Therefore, the original concept of polarization does not apply to most batteries, and the depolarizer does not react with hydrogen as H_{2}. Still, the term is used today, however, in most cases, it might be replaced with oxidizing agent.

Many different substances have been used as depolarizers; the most notable are listed below.

== Oxidizing agents ==
These oxidize the hydrogen to water. Examples include:

- Nitric acid, used in the Grove cell and Bunsen cell
- Chromic acid, used in the Chromic acid cell
- Manganese dioxide, used in the Leclanché cell and dry cell

Nitric and chromic acids are powerful oxidizing agents, and effective depolarizers, but their hazardous nature makes them unsuitable for general use. Manganese dioxide is, therefore, the most widely used depolarizer.

== Salts of metals ==
The hydrogen ions displace metal from the salt so that metal, instead of hydrogen, is deposited on the positive plate. Examples:

- Silver oxide, used in the silver-oxide battery
- Copper sulphate, used in the Daniell cell
- Mercurous sulphate, used in the Weston and Clark standard cells
