= International Electrical Congress =

The International Electrical Congress was a series of international meetings, from 1881 to 1904, in the then new field of applied electricity. The first meeting was initiated by the French government, including official national representatives, leading scientists, and others. Subsequent meetings also included official representatives, leading scientists, and others. Primary aims were to develop reliable standards, both in relation to electrical units and electrical apparatus.

== Historical background ==
In 1881, both within and across countries, different electrical units were being used. There were at least 12 different units of electromotive force, 10 different units of electric current and 15 different units of resistance.

A number of international Congresses were held, and sometimes referred to as International Electrical Congress, Electrical Conference, and similar variations. Secondary sources make different judgments about how to classify the Congresses. In this article, the Congresses with representatives from national governments are identified as International Electrical Congress. Other Congresses — often addressing the same issues — are identified here as Concurrent Related International Electrical Congresses. Some of these related conferences were devoted to preparing for an International Electrical Congress.

In 1906 the International Electrotechnical Commission was created. Congresses were organised under its auspices were also sometimes referred to as International Electrical Congress. In this article, Congresses organized by the commission are listed under International Electrotechnical Congresses, while other related Congresses are listed under Related International Electrotechnical Conferences.

== International Electrical Congress ==
=== 1881 in Paris ===
Held from 15 September-5 October 1881, in connection with the International Exposition of Electricity. Adolphe Cochery, Minister of Posts and Telegraphs of the French Government, was the chairman. At the Congress, William Thomson (United Kingdom), Hermann von Helmholtz (Germany), and Gilbert Govi (Italy) were elected as foreign vice-presidents. About 200-250 persons participated, and a proceedings was published in 1882. Notable participants included: Helmholtz, Clausius, Kirchhoff, Werner Siemens, Ernst Mach, Rayleigh, and Lenz, among others.

==== Important events ====
The three main topics for the Congress were: electrical units, improvements in international telegraphy, and various applications of electricity. The Congress resolved to endorse the 1873 British Association for the Advancement of Science proposal for defining the ohm and the volt as practical units, and also made resolutions to define ampere, coulomb and farad, as units for current, quantity, and capacity respectively, to complete the practical system. It also resolved that an international committee should conduct new tests to determine the length of the column of mercury for measuring the ohm.

=== 1893 in Chicago ===
Held from 21 to 25 August, in connection with the World's Columbian Exposition, with almost 500 participants. Elisha Gray was the Congress president. A proceedings was published.

Refinements to the units of measurement, including the Clark cell, were discussed. Laid down rules for the physical representation: ohm, ampere and volt. Ohm and ampere were defined in terms of the CGS electromagnetic system. The units were named international to distinguish them from the 1881 proposal, hence International System of Electrical and Magnetic Units.

=== 1900 in Paris ===
Held in 18–25 August in connection with the Paris Exposition Universelle. Éleuthère Mascart was the congress president. There were more than 900 participants, about half of which were from France, and about 120 technical papers presented. A two-volume proceedings was published in 1901

Dealt mainly with magnetic units. During this congress, names were proposed for four magnetic-circuit units in the C.G.S. System. Only two were accepted by vote: the C.G.S. unit for magnetic flux ( Φ) was named maxwell and C.G.S. unit of magnetising force (or magnetic field intensity) was named gauss (H). Some delegates mistakenly believed and reported that the gauss was adopted as the C.G.S. unit of flux density (B). This mistake has been reproduced in contemporary texts, which have cited a mistaken report. It is relevant to note that the Congress's official formulation for the gauss was in French, champ magnetique, which would be translated into English as magnetic field, which has been used to refer both to (B) and (H), noted in magnetic field. In 1930 the International Electrotechnical Commission decided that the magnetic field strength (H) was different from the magnetic flux density (B), but now assigned the gauss to refer to magnetic flux density (B), in contrast to the decision from this Congress.

=== 1904 in St.Louis, Missouri ===
Held from 12 to 17 September 1904, in connection with the Louisiana Purchase Exposition

Recommended two permanent international commissions, one about electrical units and standards, the other about unification of nomenclature and characteristics of electrical machines and apparatus. These recommendations are considered the seed that initiated the creation of the International Electrotechnical Commission in 1906.

== Concurrent Related International Electrical Congresses ==
During the period that the Electrical Congresses were held, other conferences and international Congresses were held, sometimes in preparation to the official Electrical Congresses. These events are listed here.

=== 1882 in Paris ===
Conférence international pour la détermination des unités électriques (International Conference for Determination of Electrical Units)

Held 16–26 October. Was motivated by a resolution from the 1881 International Electrical Congress. A verbal transcript of the conference was published.

=== 1884 in Paris ===
International Conference for Determination of Electrical Units

=== 1889 in Paris ===
International Congress of Electricians Held 24–31 August, in connection with Exposition universelle de 1889. About 530 participants from at least 11 countries.

Adopted several units, including practical units of power (watt) and work (joule), where 1 watt = 10^{7} erg/second, and 1 joule = 10^{7} erg. Considered practical magnetic units, but did not make any resolutions or recommendations.

=== 1891 in Frankfurt ===
Held 7–12 September, in connection with the International Electrotechnical Exhibition (Die Internationale Elektrotechnische Ausstellung 1891), organized by Elektrotechnische Gesellschaft. Galileo Ferraris was a vice-president at the conference. There were 715 participants (473 from Germany and 243 from other countries, including Austria, United Kingdom, USA, and France). An official report of the conference was published.

Papers and discussions were organised in five main areas: Theory and Measuring Science; Strong Current Technology; Signalling, Telegraphy, and Telephony; Electrochemistry and Electric Current Applications; and Legislation to Mediate Conflicts between Cities around different currents used for electric lights, telephones, and telegraphs.

=== 1892 in Edinburgh ===
Held in connection with the British Association for the Advancement of Science annual meeting

=== 1896 in Geneva ===
Held 4–9 August, in connection with the Swiss National Exposition. Insufficient and late communication about the organization of the Congress hampered widespread participation, so that the conference had about 200 participants, mostly from Switzerland, Austria, Germany and Belgium.

Topics for discussion were magnetic units, photometric units, the long-distance transmission of power, the protection of high-tension lines against atmospheric discharge, and the problems and challenges of electric railway operation.

== International Electrotechnical Congress ==
=== 1908 in London ===
International Conference on Electric Units and Standards. Held in October. Organized by the Commission on Electric Units and Standards of the International Electrotechnical Commission

Formal adoption of the "international units" (e.g., international ohm, international ampere), which were proposed originally in the 1893 meeting of the International Electrical Congress in Chicago.

=== 1911 in Turin ===
Held 10–17 September, organized by Associazione elettrotecnica italiana and the Italian Electrotechnical Committee of the International Electrotechnical Commission

=== 1915 in San Francisco ===
Was to be held 13–18 September, and organized by the American Institute of Electrical Engineers, but was cancelled because of the outbreak of World War I.

== Related International Electrotechnical Conferences ==
=== 1905 in Berlin ===
Internationale Konferenz über Elektrische Masseinheiten (International Conference on Electrical Units)

Held 23–25 October at Physikalisch-Technischen Reichsanstalt at Charlottenburg. The 1904 Congress recommended holding an international conference to address discrepancies in the electrical units and their interpretation. Emil Warburg, president of the Physikalisch-Technische Reichsanstalt in Germany, invited representatives from corresponding national laboratories in the United States (National Bureau of Standards), the United Kingdom (National Physical Laboratory), and the official standards commissions in Austria and Belgium to an informal conference on electrical standards and units. Additionally Mascart (France), Rayleigh (United Kingdom) and Carhart (USA) were invited because of their expertise and influence. Thirteen of the fifteen invited persons participated in the conference, six from the Reichsanstalt, two from the Belgian Commission on Electrical Units, two from the Austrian Commission on Standardization, Richard Glazebrook from the National Physical Laboratory, Mascart, and Carhart. The non-attendees were Samuel Wesley Stratton, director of the National Bureau of Standard, who sent three papers outlining the positions and proposals of the Bureau, and Rayleigh. A proceedings was published.

Concentrated on the redefinition of the ohm, ampere, and volt, as resolved in the 1904 Congress. The aim was to attain true international uniformity in definitions of these concepts. The main question was whether ohm, ampere, and volt should be independent of each other, or only two should be defined, and which two. The conference concluded that only two electrical units should be taken as fundamental: the international ohm and the international ampere. It also adopted the Western Cadmium Cell as the standard cell, and added rules about the preparation and use of the mercury tube, whose geometry was specified at the 1893 Congress. The conference resolved that another international conference in the course of a year should be held to establish an agreement about the electric standards in use, because different countries had different laws about electrical units.

=== 1908 in Marseille ===
Held 14–19 September, in connection with the L'exposition internationale des applications de l'électricité. A three-volume proceedings was published.
