= Chromic acid cell =

Type of battery

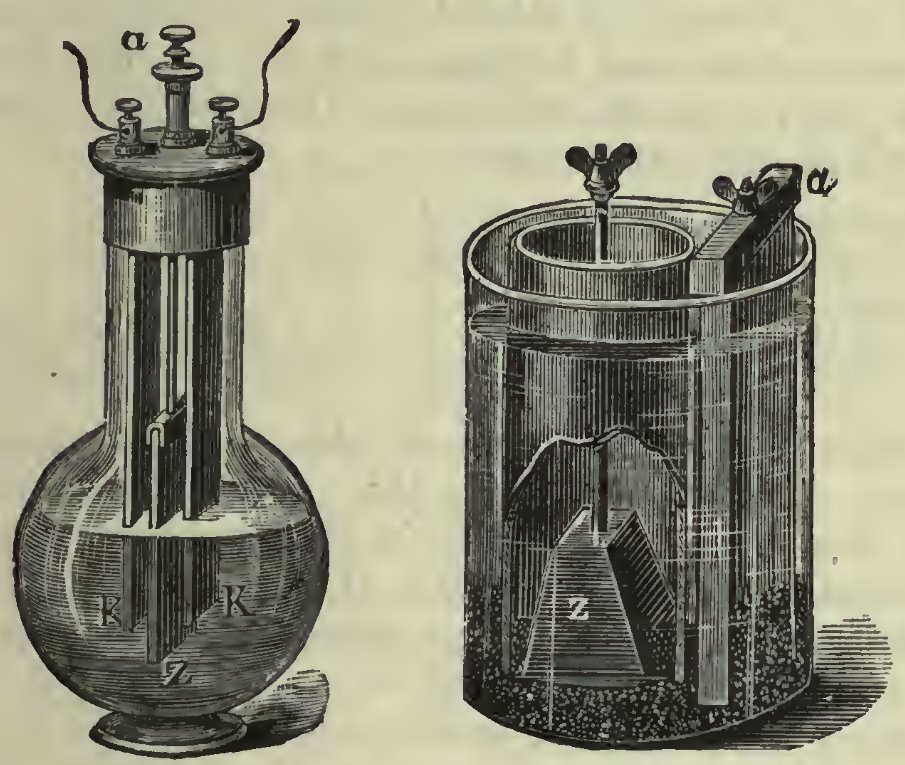
Bichromate cells. Left - single fluid, right - two fluid

The chromic acid cell is a type of primary cell which uses chromic acid as a depolarizer. The chromic acid is usually made by acidifying (with sulfuric acid) a solution of potassium dichromate. The old name for potassium dichromate is potassium bichromate and the cell is often called a bichromate cell. This type of cell is now only of historical interest.

== Construction ==
The main elements of the cell are:

- Anode, zinc
- Electrolyte, dilute sulfuric acid
- Depolarizer, chromic acid
- Cathode, carbon

The cell is made in two forms - the single-fluid type, attributed to Poggendorff and the two-fluid type, attributed to Fuller. In both cases, cell voltage is about 2 volts.

=== Poggendorff cell ===
The cell is set up in a long-necked glass bottle with a zinc plate located between two carbon plates. The electrolyte and depolarizer are then mixed. The mixture would dissolve the zinc plate even when the cell is not in use, so there is a mechanism for lifting the zinc plate out of the liquid and storing it in the neck of the bottle.

=== Fuller cell ===
The cell is set up in a glass, or glazed earthenware, pot. This contained the chromic acid solution, the carbon plate and a porous pot. Inside the porous pot is dilute sulfuric acid, the zinc rod, and a small quantity of mercury. The mercury formed an amalgam with the zinc and this reduced "local action", i.e. unwanted dissolution of the zinc when the cell is not in use.

== See also ==
- List of battery types
