= Grove cell =

Early acid battery cell

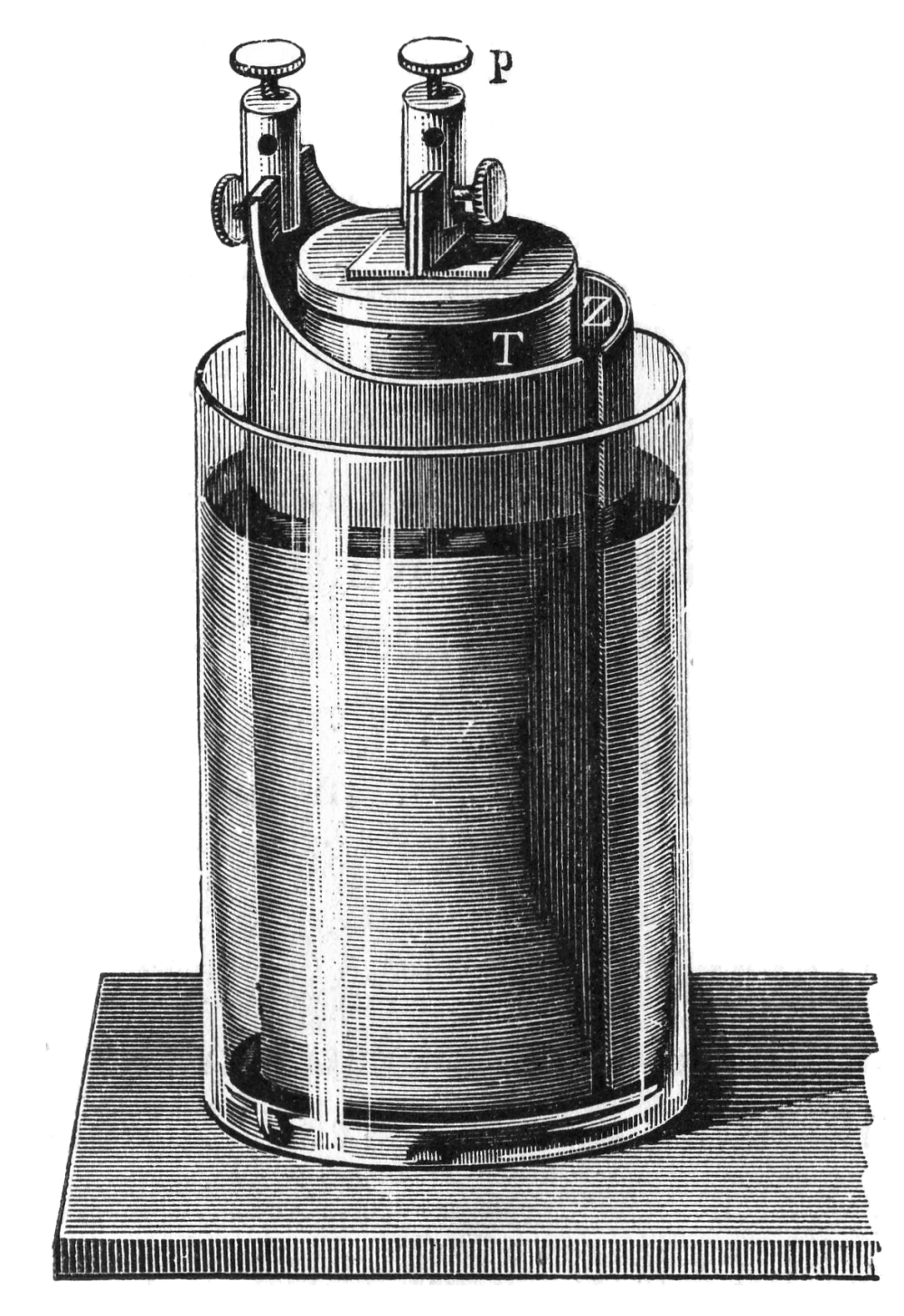
Grove cell (1897)

The Grove cell was an early electric primary cell named after its inventor, Welsh physical scientist William Robert Grove, and consisted of a zinc anode in dilute sulfuric acid and a platinum cathode in concentrated nitric acid, the two separated by a porous ceramic pot.

== Cell details ==
The Grove cell voltage is about 1.9 volts and arises from the following reaction:

Zn + H_{2}SO_{4} + 2 HNO_{3} ⇌ ZnSO_{4} + 2 H_{2}O + 2 NO_{2}↑

== Use ==
The Grove cell was the favored power source of the early American telegraph system in the years 1840 – 1860, as it offered a high current output and higher voltage (1.9 volts) than the earlier Daniell cell (1.1 volts).

== Disadvantages ==
By the time of the American Civil War, as telegraph traffic increased, the Grove cell's tendency to discharge poisonous nitrogen dioxide (NO_{2}) fumes proved increasingly hazardous to health, and as telegraphs became more complex, the need for constant voltage became critical. The Grove cell was limited in this respect, because as the cell discharged, voltage reduced. Eventually, Grove cells were replaced in use by Daniell cells.

== See also ==
- List of battery types
- History of the battery
- Bunsen cell, Using cheaper carbon instead of platinum.

== Notes ==
- Stillman, Benjamin (1861). Principles of Physics. Theodore Bliss. p. 578.
- Ayrton, W.E. (1911). Practical Electricity. Cassell and Company. pp. 183–185.
