= Henry Smith Carhart =

American physicist and university professor

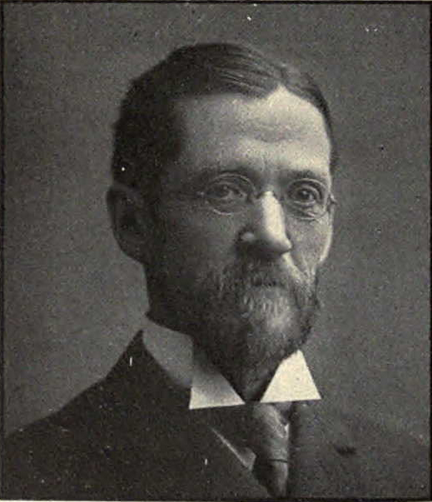
Carhart from the 1902 Michiganensian

Henry Smith Carhart, Ph.B. (1844–1920) was an American physicist and university professor. He was born in Coeymans, New York on March 27, 1844, and graduated from Wesleyan University in 1869 and completed an M.A. degree from the same institution in 1873. He pursued additional graduate studies at Yale, Harvard, and the Humboldt University of Berlin. After serving as professor at Northwestern University, Carhart was appointed to the faculty of the University of Michigan in 1886, where he remained until his retirement as professor emeritus in 1909.

Carhart had a keen interest in electricity. He devised a voltaic cell called the Carhart-Clark cell, among other inventions. He was a delegate from the United States to several electrical congresses, including those at Chicago, Illinois, 1893, at St. Louis, Missouri, 1904, at Berlin, 1905, and at London, 1908. Carhart was president of the board of judges at the department of electricity at the World's Columbian Exposition in Chicago in 1893.

== Works ==
He was the author of textbooks and treatises, including:

- Primary Batteries (1891)
- University Physics (1894–96)
- Electrical Measurements (1895)
- High School Physics, with H. N. Chute (1901)
- College Physics (1910)
- First Principles of Physics, with H. N. Chute (1912)
