= Polarization (electrochemistry) =

Mechanical side-effects of an electrochemical process

In electrochemistry, polarization is a collective term for certain mechanical side-effects (of an electrochemical process) by which isolating barriers develop at the interface between electrode and electrolyte. These side-effects influence the reaction mechanisms, as well as the chemical kinetics of corrosion and metal deposition. In a reaction, the attacking reagents can displace the bonding electrons. This electronic displacement in turn may be due to certain effects, some of which are permanent (inductive and mesomeric effects), and the others are temporary (electromeric effect). Those effects which are permanently operating in the molecule are known as polarization effects, and those effects which are brought into play by attacking reagent (and as the attacking reagent is removed, the electronic displacement disappears) are known as polarisability effects.

The term 'polarization' derives from the early 19th-century discovery that electrolysis causes the elements in an electrolyte to be attracted towards one or the other pole— i.e. the gasses were polarized towards the electrodes. Thus, initially polarization was essentially a description of electrolysis itself, and in the context of electrochemical cells used to describe the effects on the electrolyte (which was then called "polarization liquid"). In time, as more electrochemical processes were invented, the term polarization evolved to denote any (potentially undesirable) mechanical side-effects that occur at the interface between electrolyte and electrodes.

These mechanical side-effects are:

- activation polarization: the accumulation of gasses (or other non-reagent products) at the interface between electrode and electrolyte.
- concentration polarization: uneven depletion of reagents in the electrolyte cause concentration gradients in boundary layers.

Both effects isolate the electrode from the electrolyte, impeding reaction and charge transfer between the two. The immediate consequences of these barriers are:

- the reduction potential decreases, the reaction rate slows and eventually halts.
- electric current is increasingly converted into heat rather than into desired electrochemical work.
- as predicted by Ohm's law, either electromotive force decreases and current increases, or vice versa.
- the self-discharge rate increases in electrochemical cells.

Each of these immediate consequences has multiple secondary effects. For instance, heat affects the crystalline structure of the electrode material. This in turn can influence reaction rate, and/or accelerate dendrite formation, and/or deform the plates, and/or precipitate thermal runaway.

The mechanical side-effects can be desirable in some electrochemical processes, for example, certain types of electropolishing and electroplating take advantage of the fact that evolved gasses will first accumulate in the depressions of the plate. This feature can be used to reduce current in the depressions, and exposes ridges and edges to higher currents. Undesirable polarization can be suppressed by vigorous agitation of the electrolyte, or – when agitation is impractical (such as in a stationary battery) – with a depolarizer.

== See also ==
- Depolarizer
- Nernst equation
