= Josiah Latimer Clark =

British electrical engineer (1822–1898)

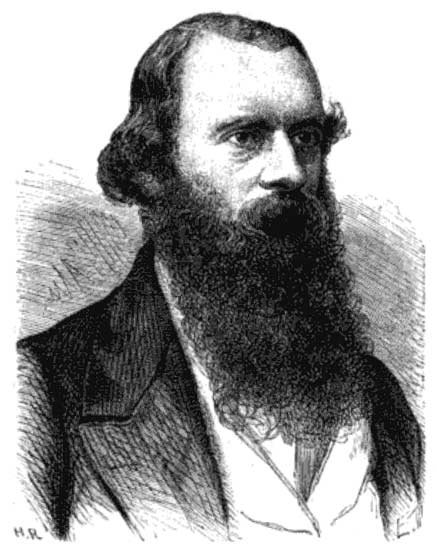
- Born: 10 March 1822; Great Marlow, Buckinghamshire
- Died: 30 October 1898 (aged 76)

Josiah Latimer Clark FRS FRAS (10 March 1822 – 30 October 1898) was an English electrical engineer, born in Great Marlow, Buckinghamshire.

== Biography ==
Josiah Latimer Clark was born in Great Marlow, Buckinghamshire, and was the younger brother to Edwin Clark (1814–1894). Latimer Clark studied chemistry at school. His first job was a large Dublin chemical manufacturing establishment. In 1848 he started to work in his brother Edwin's civil engineering practice and became assistant engineer at the Menai Strait bridge. Two years later, when his brother was appointed Engineer to the Electric Telegraph Company, he again acted as his assistant, and subsequently succeeded him as Chief Engineer. In 1854, he took out a patent "for conveying letters or parcels between places by the pressure of air and vacuum," and later, in 1863, was concerned in the construction, by the London Pneumatic Despatch Company, of a tube between the London North-West District post office and Euston station, London.

About the same period he was engaged in experimental researches on the propagation of the electric current in submarine cables, on which he published a pamphlet in 1855, and in 1859 he was a member of the committee that was appointed by the government to consider the numerous failures of submarine cable enterprises. He later realised that Francis Ronalds had described the risk and cause of signal retardation in telegraph lines as early as 1816 and he thereafter devoted significant effort to bringing Ronalds' telegraphic achievements to public attention. He was President of the Society of Telegraph Engineers in 1875 when Ronalds' renowned electrical library was gifted to the new Society.

Clark paid much attention to the subject of electrical measurement, and besides designing various improvements in method and apparatus and inventing the Clark standard cell, he took a leading part in the movement for the systematization of electrical standards, which was inaugurated by the paper which he and Sir CT Bright read on the question before the British Association in 1861. With Bright also he devised improvements in the insulation of submarine cables. In the later part of his life he was a member of several firms engaged in laying submarine cables, in manufacturing electrical appliances, and in hydraulic engineering. Clark was one of the first authors to attach the metric prefixes mega- and micro- to units other than the metre.

Clark died in London on 30 October 1898.

== Family ==
In 1854 Clark married Margaret Helen Preece, sister of Sir William Preece. They had two children, but divorced in 1861. Clark remarried in 1863.

== Publications ==
Elementary Treatise on Electrical Measurement, for the use of Telegraph Inspectors and Operators (1868),

Electrical Tables and Formulæ, for the use of Telegraph Inspectors and Operators (1871),

A Treatise on the Transit Instrument as Applied to the Determination of Time, for the use of Country Gentlemen (1882),

A Manual of the Transit Instrument (1882),

The Star Guide (with Herbert Sadler, 1886),

Transit Tables (annually 1884-1888),

A Dictionary of Metric and other useful Measures (1891),

A Memoir of Sir W. F. Cooke (1895).
