= Weston cell =

Wet chemical cell that produces a precise voltage

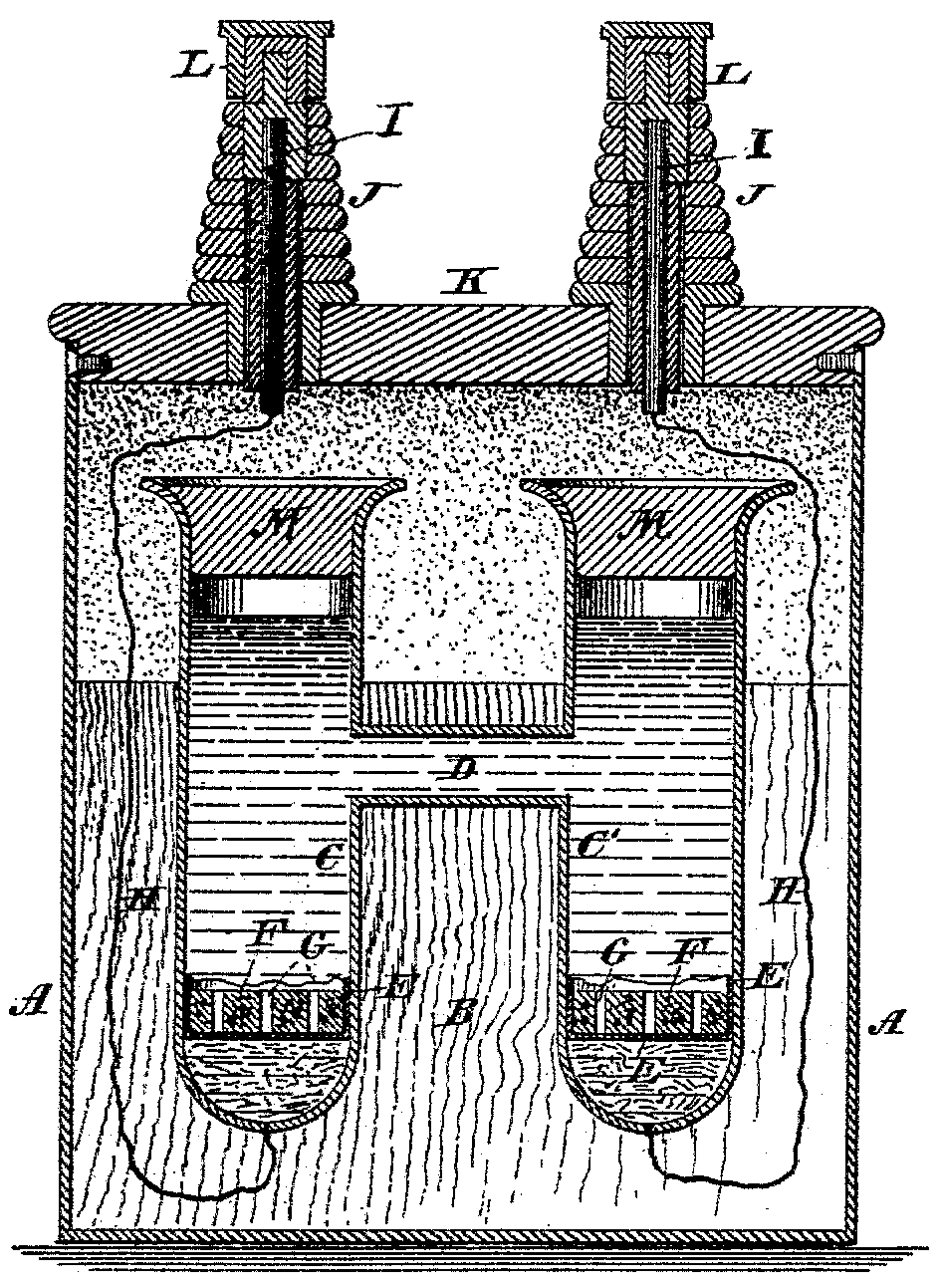
Drawing from Edward Weston's US Patent 494827 depicting the standard cell.

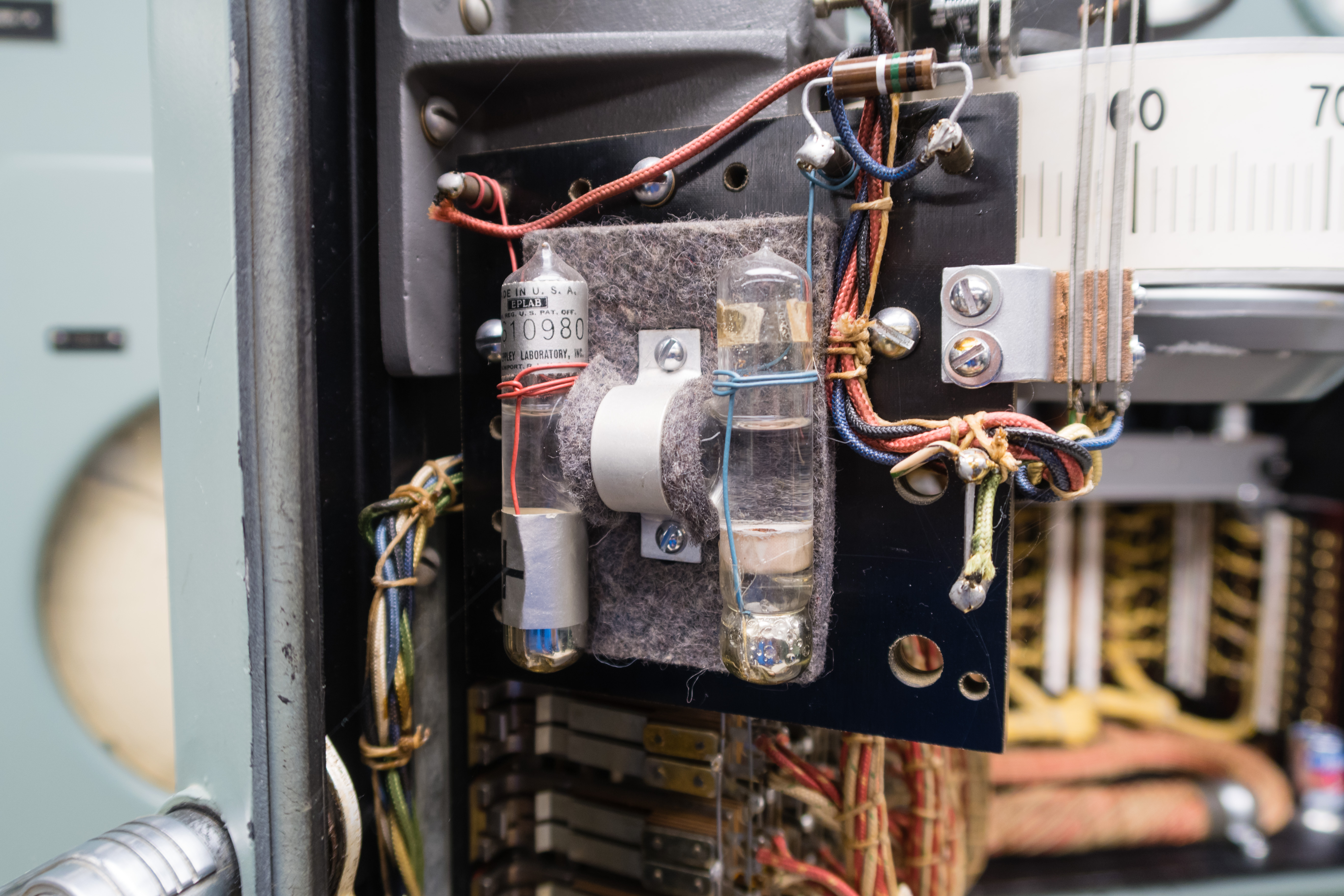
Weston cell

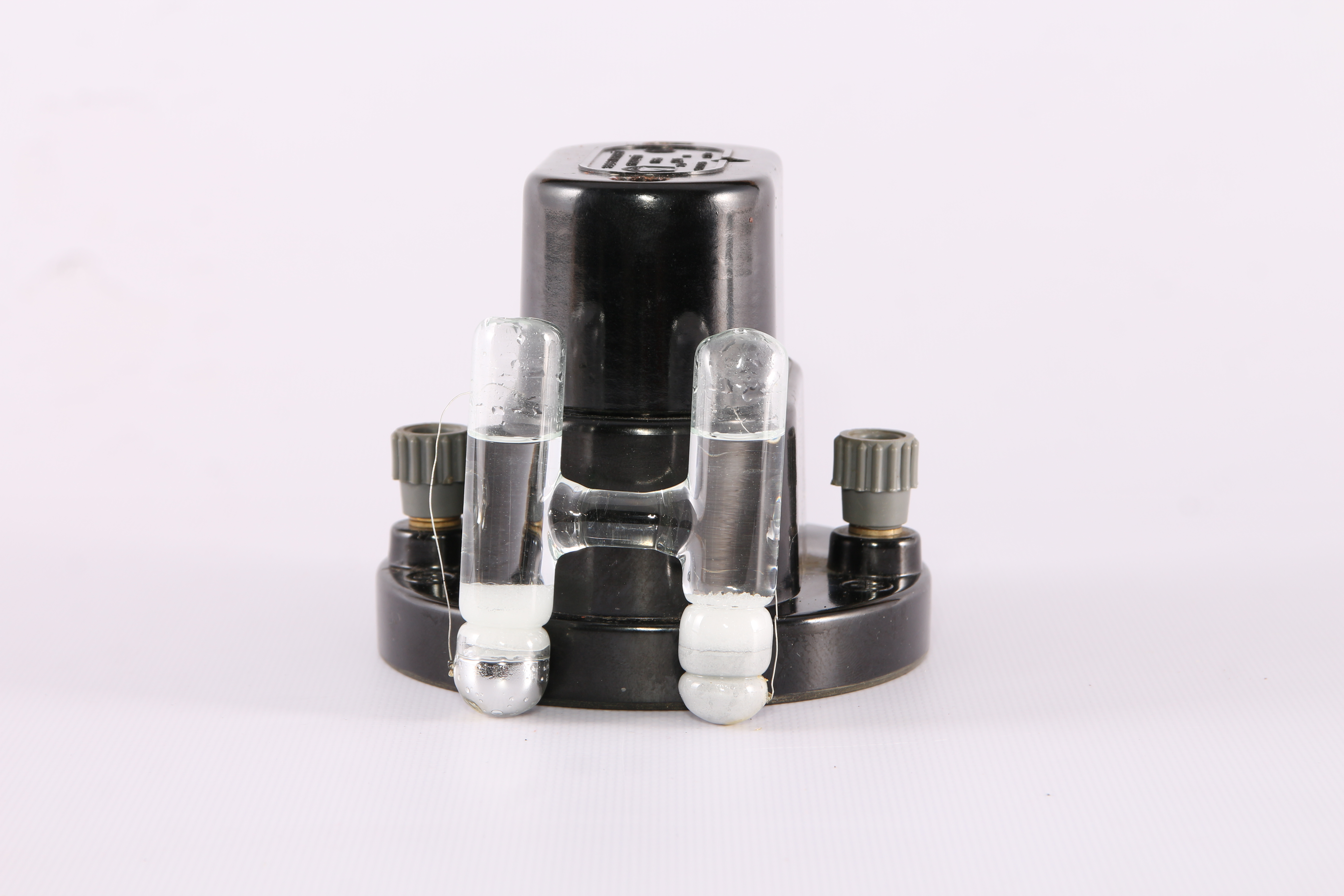
Standard cell, extracted from case. Made in USSR

The Weston cell or Weston standard cell is a wet-chemical cell that produces a highly stable voltage suitable as a laboratory standard for calibration of voltmeters. Invented by Edward Weston in 1893, it was adopted as the International Standard for EMF from 1911 until superseded by the Josephson voltage standard in 1990.

== Chemistry ==
The anode is an amalgam of cadmium with mercury with a cathode of pure mercury over which a paste of mercurous sulfate and mercury is placed. The electrolyte is a saturated solution of cadmium sulfate, and the depolarizer is a paste of mercurous sulfate.

As shown in the illustration, the cell is set up in an H-shaped glass vessel with the cadmium amalgam in one leg and the pure mercury in the other. Electrical connections to the cadmium amalgam and the mercury are made by platinum wires fused through the lower ends of the legs.

Anode reaction
Cd(s) → Cd^{2+}(aq) + 2e^{−}

Cathode reaction
(Hg^{+})_{2}SO^{2−}_{4}(s) + 2e^{−} → 2Hg(l) + SO^{2−}_{4}(aq)

Reference cells must be applied in such a way that no current is drawn from them.

== Characteristics ==
The original design was a saturated cadmium cell producing a 1.018638 V reference and had the advantage of having a lower temperature coefficient than the previously used Clark cell.

One of the great advantages of the Weston normal cell is its small change of electromotive force with change of temperature. At any temperature t between 0 °C and 40 °C,

E_{t}/V = E_{20}/V − 0.0000406 (t/°C − 20) − 0.00000095 (t/°C − 20)^{2} + 0.00000001 (t/°C − 20)^{3}.

This temperature formula was adopted by the London conference of 1908.

The temperature coefficient can be reduced by shifting to an unsaturated design, the predominant type today. However, an unsaturated cell's output decreases by some 80 microvolts per year, which is compensated by periodic calibration against a saturated cell.

== See also ==
- List of battery types

== Literature ==
- Practical Electricity by W. E. Ayrton and T. Mather, published by Cassell and Company, London, 1911, pp 198–203
- U.S. patent 494,827, "Voltaic cell"
- Standard Cells, Their Construction, Maintenance, and Characteristics by Walter J. Hamer, National Bureau of Standards Monograph 84, January 15, 1965.
