= Conventional electrical unit =

Historical high-precision units of measurement

A conventional electrical unit (or conventional unit where there is no risk of ambiguity) is a unit of measurement in the field of electricity which is based on the so-called "conventional values" of the Josephson constant, the von Klitzing constant agreed by the International Committee for Weights and Measures (CIPM) in 1988, as well as Δν_{Cs} used to define the second. These units are very similar in scale to their corresponding SI units, but are not identical because of the different values used for the constants. They are distinguished from the corresponding SI units by setting the symbol in italic typeface and adding a subscript "90" – e.g., the conventional volt has the symbol V_{90} – as they came into international use on 1 January 1990.

This system was developed to increase the precision of measurements: The Josephson and von Klitzing constants can be realized with great precision, repeatability and ease, and are exactly defined in terms of the universal constants e and h. The conventional electrical units represent a significant step towards using "natural" fundamental physics for practical measurement purposes. They achieved acceptance as an international standard in parallel to the SI system of units and are commonly used outside of the physics community in both engineering and industry. Addition of the constant c would be needed to define units for all dimensions used in physics, as in the SI.

The SI system made the transition to equivalent definitions 29 years later but with values of the constants defined to match the old SI units more precisely. Consequently, the conventional electrical units differ slightly from the corresponding SI units, now with exactly defined ratios.

== Historical development ==
Several significant steps have been taken in the last half century to increase the precision and utility of measurement units:

- In 1967, the thirteenth General Conference on Weights and Measures (CGPM) defined the second of atomic time in the International System of Units as the duration of 9192631770 periods of the radiation corresponding to the transition between the two hyperfine levels of the ground state of the cesium-133 atom.
- In 1983, the seventeenth CGPM redefined the metre in terms of the second and the speed of light, thus fixing the speed of light at exactly 299792458 m/s.
- In 1988, the CIPM recommended adoption of conventional values for the Josephson constant as exactly K_{J-90} = 483597.9×10^{9} Hz/V and for the von Klitzing constant as exactly R_{K-90} = 25812.807 Ω as of 1 January 1990.
- In 1991, the eighteenth CGPM noted the conventional values for the Josephson constant and the von Klitzing constant.
- In 2000, the CIPM approved the use of the quantum Hall effect, with the value of R_{K-90} to be used to establish a reference standard of resistance.
- In 2018, the twenty-sixth CGPM resolved to abrogate the conventional values of the Josephson and von Klitzing constants with the 2019 revision of the SI.

== Definition ==
Conventional electrical units are based on defined values of the caesium-133 hyperfine transition frequency, Josephson constant and the von Klitzing constant, the first two which allow a very precise practical measurement of time and electromotive force, and the last which allows a very precise practical measurement of electrical resistance.

Constant	Conventional exact value (CIPM, 1988; until 2018)	Empirical value (in SI units) (CODATA, 2014)	Exact value (SI units, 2019)
^{133}Cs hyperfine transition frequency	Δν(^{133}Cs)_{hfs} = 9192631770 Hz		Δν(^{133}Cs)_{hfs} = 9192631770 Hz
Josephson constant	K_{J-90} = 483597.9 GHz/V	K_{J} = 483597.8525(30) GHz/V	K_{J} = (2 × 1.602176634×10^{−19} C)/(6.62607015×10^{−34} J⋅s)
von Klitzing constant	R_{K-90} = 25812.807 Ω	R_{K} = 25812.8074555(59) Ω	R_{K} = (6.62607015×10^{−34} J⋅s)/((1.602176634×10^{−19} C)^{2})

- The conventional volt, V_{90}, is the electromotive force (or electric potential difference) measured against a Josephson effect standard using the defined value of the Josephson constant, K_{J-90}; that is, by the relation K_{J} = 483597.9 GHz/V_{90}. See Josephson voltage standard.
- The conventional ohm, Ω_{90}, is the electrical resistance measured against a quantum Hall effect standard using the defined value of the von Klitzing constant, R_{K-90}; that is, by the relation R_{K} = 25812.807 Ω_{90}.
- Other conventional electrical units are defined by the normal relationships between units paralleling those of SI, as in the conversion table below.

== Conversion to SI units ==
Unit	Symbol	Definition	Related to SI	SI value (CODATA 2014)	SI value (2019)
conventional volt	V_{90}	see above	(K_{J-90})/K_{J} V	1.0000000983(61) V	1.00000010666... V
conventional ohm	Ω_{90}	see above	R_{K}/(R_{K-90}) Ω	1.00000001765(23) Ω	1.00000001779... Ω
conventional ampere	A_{90}	V_{90}/Ω_{90}	(K_{J-90})/K_{J}⋅(R_{K-90})/R_{K} A	1.0000000806(61) A	1.00000008887... A
conventional coulomb	C_{90}	s⋅A_{90} = s⋅V_{90}/Ω_{90}	(K_{J-90})/K_{J}⋅(R_{K-90})/R_{K} C	1.0000000806(61) C	1.00000008887... C
conventional watt	W_{90}	A_{90}V_{90} = V_{90}^{2}/Ω_{90}	((K_{J-90})/K_{J})^{2} ⋅(R_{K-90})/R_{K} W	1.000000179(12) W	1.00000019553... W
conventional farad	F_{90}	C_{90}/V_{90} = s/Ω_{90}	(R_{K-90})/R_{K} F	0.99999998235(23) F	0.99999998220... F
conventional henry	H_{90}	s⋅Ω_{90}	R_{K}/(R_{K-90}) H	1.00000001765(23) H	1.00000001779... H

The 2019 revision of the SI defines all these units in a way that fixes the numeric values of K_{J}, R_{K} and Δν_{Cs} exactly, albeit with values of the first two that differ slightly from the conventional values. Consequently, these conventional units all have known exact values in terms of the redefined SI units. Because of this, there is no accuracy benefit from maintaining the conventional values.

== See also ==
- ITS-90
