= Bunsen cell =

Early electric battery

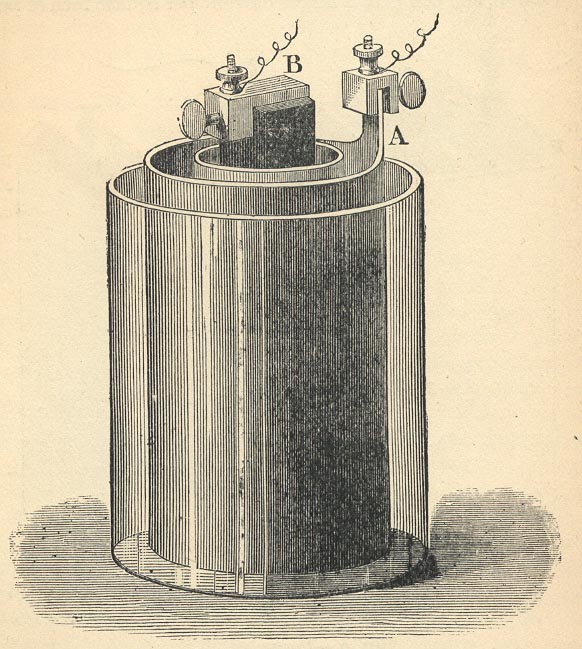
Bunsen's cell

The Bunsen cell is a zinc-carbon primary cell (colloquially called a "battery") composed of a zinc anode in dilute sulfuric acid separated by a porous pot from a carbon cathode in nitric or chromic acid.

== Cell details ==
The Bunsen cell generates about 1.9 volts which arises from the following reaction:

Zn + H_{2}SO_{4} + 2 HNO_{3} ⇌ ZnSO_{4} + 2 H_{2}O + 2 NO_{2}(g)

According to the reaction above, when 1 mole (or part) each of zinc and sulfuric acid react with 2 moles (or parts) of nitric acid, the resultant products formed are, 1 mole (or part) of zinc sulfate and 2 moles (or parts) each of water and nitrogen dioxide (gaseous, in the form of bubbles).

The cell is named after its inventor, German chemist Robert Wilhelm Bunsen, who improved upon the Grove cell by replacing Grove's expensive platinum cathode with carbon in the form of pulverized coal and coke. Like Grove's battery, Bunsen's emitted noxious fumes, which could be avoided by replacing the nitric acid with potassium dichromate.

Bunsen used this cell to extract metals. Henri Moissan used a stack of 90 cells for the electrolysis of hydrogen fluoride to obtain fluorine for the first time.

== See also ==
- History of the battery
- List of battery types
- Battery nomenclature
