= International Exposition of Electricity =

World's fair held in Paris, France, in 1881

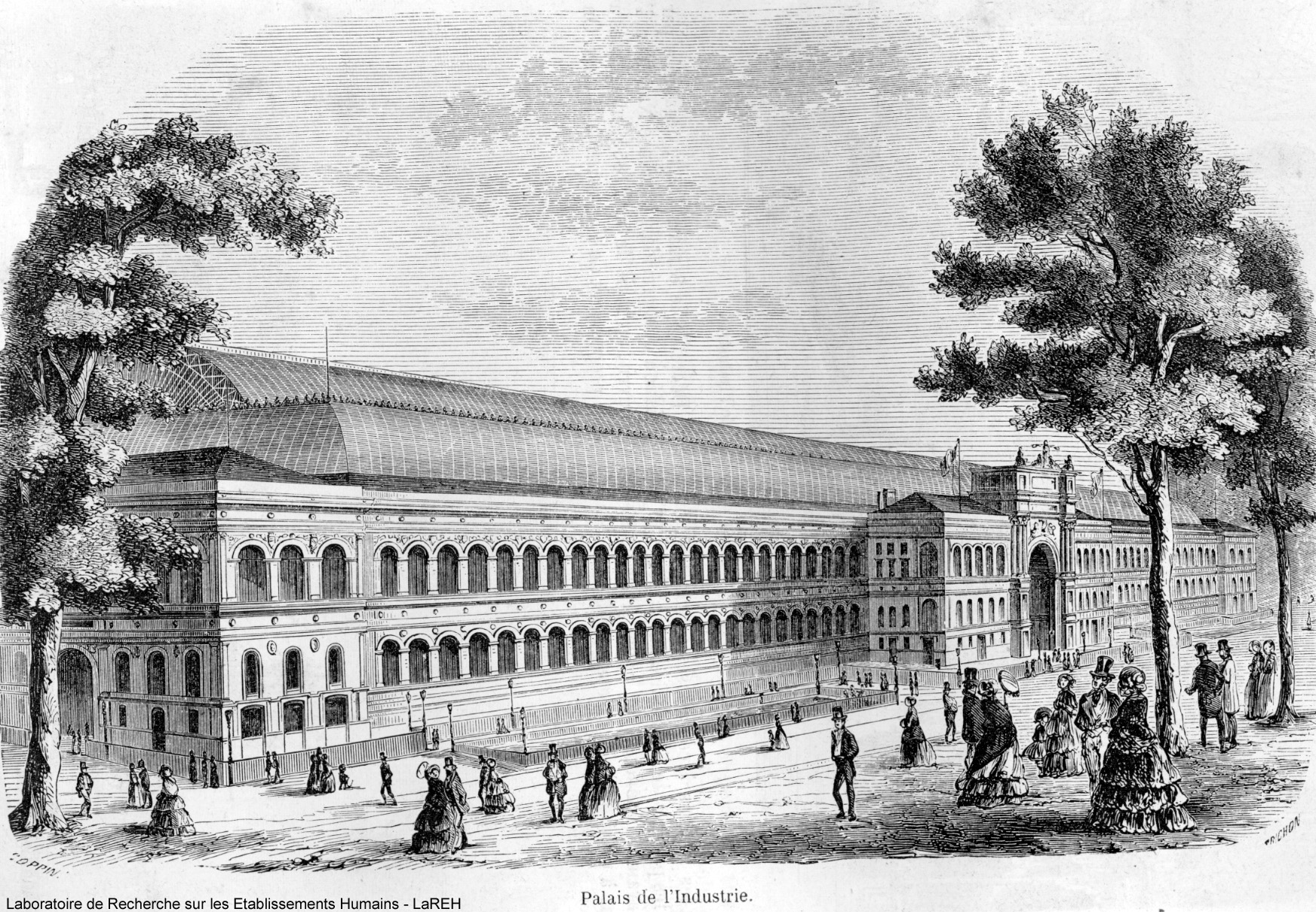
- Palais de l'Industrie in 1855, site of the International Exposition of Electricity 1881
- Native name: Exposition internationale d'Électricité
- Date: 1 August through to 15 November 1881
- Venue: Palais de l'Industrie on the Champs-Élysées
- Location: Paris, France
- Type: Exposition, science festival

The first International Exposition of Electricity (French: Exposition internationale d'Électricité) ran from 1 August 1881 through to 15 November 1881 at the Palais de l'Industrie on the Champs-Élysées in Paris, France. It served to display the advances in electrical technology since the small electrical display at the 1878 Universal Exposition. Exhibitors came from the United Kingdom, United States, Germany, Italy and the Netherlands, as well as from France. As part of the exhibition, the first International Congress of Electricians presented numerous scientific and technical papers, including definitions of the standard practical units volt, ohm and ampere.

== History ==
Adolphe Cochery, Minister of Posts and Telegraphs of the time, had initially suggested that an international exposition should be held.

This show was a great stir. The public could admire the dynamo of Zénobe Gramme, the incandescent light, the théâtrophone (with stereophonic sound), the electric tramway of Werner von Siemens, the telephone of Alexander Graham Bell, an electrical distribution network by Marcel Deprez, and an electric boat by Gustave Trouvé. As part of the exhibition, the first International Congress of Electricians, which met in the halls of the Palais du Trocadero, presented numerous scientific and technical papers, including definitions of the standard practical units volt, ohm and ampere, the International System of Electrical and Magnetic Units.

George Berger was the Commissioner General. Aside from the provision of the building by the French government, the exhibition was privately financed. Organizers would donate profits to scientific works in the public interest.

== International Congress of Electricians ==
This congress was a decisive step in the building of the modern International System of Units (SI), since ohm, ampere, coulomb and farad were defined at this occasion. Main participants include Éleuthère Mascart, William Thomson (who later became Lord Kelvin), Hermann von Helmholtz, Rudolf Clausius, Gustav Kirchhoff, Gustav Heinrich Wiedemann, Carl Wilhelm Siemens and his brother the industrialist Werner von Siemens, who had to renounce to the siemens mercury as the resistance unit (not to be confused with siemens, current SI unit of conductance).

== Exhibits ==
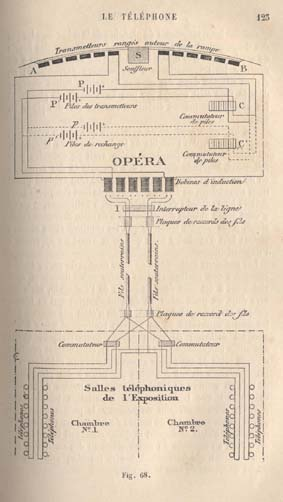
Using the described théâtrophone apparatus, visitors could hear the live opera two kilometres away in stereo.

Among the exhibits were:

- Apparatus for production and transmission of electricity,
- natural and artificial magnets, and compasses,
- devices used in the study of electricity,
- many applications of electricity (sound, heat, light, electroplating, electrochemistry, signage, power, industrial applications, agricultural and domestic),
- lightning,
- old instruments in connection with electricity.

Electric lighting with incandescent lamps was one of key developments on display at the exposition, with up to 2500 lamps used to light the venue. The lamps of Thomas Edison, St. George Lane-Fox, Hiram Maxim, and Joseph Swan were compared in extensive tests by a committee, including exposition juror William Crookes, to establish the most efficient lamp design. The conclusion was the high resistance Edison lamp was the most efficient, followed by the Lane-Fox, Swan, and Maxim lamps.
