= Clark cell =

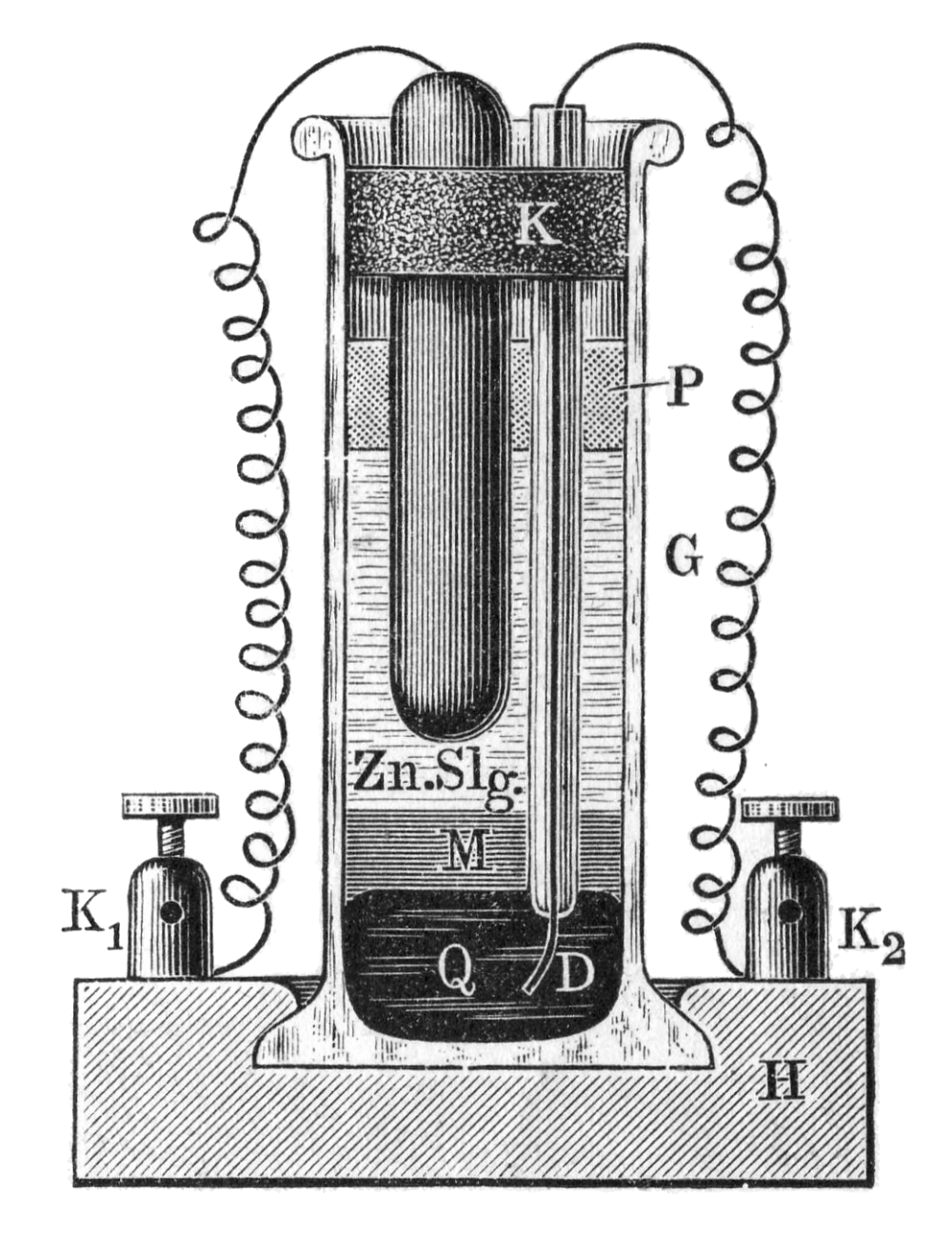
Clark cell (1897)

The Clark cell, invented by English engineer Josiah Latimer Clark in 1873, is a wet-chemical cell (colloquially: battery) that produces a highly stable voltage. In 1893, the output of the Clark cell at 15 °C was defined by the International Electrical Congress as 1.434 volts, and this definition became law in the United States in 1894. This definition was later supplanted by one based on the Weston cell.

== Chemistry ==
Clark cells use a zinc, or zinc amalgam, anode and a mercury cathode in a saturated aqueous solution of zinc sulfate, with a paste of mercurous sulfate as depolarizer.

== Construction ==
=== Original cell ===
Clark's original cell was set up in a glass jar in a similar way to a gravity Daniell cell. The copper cathode was replaced by a pool of mercury at the bottom of the jar. Above this was the mercurous sulfate paste and, above that, the zinc sulfate solution. A short zinc rod dipped into the zinc sulfate solution. The zinc rod was supported by a cork with two holes — one for the zinc rod and the other for a glass tube reaching to the bottom of the cell. A platinum wire, fused into the glass tube, made contact with the mercury pool. When complete, the cell was sealed with a layer of marine glue.

=== H-form cell ===
The H-form cell was introduced by Lord Rayleigh in 1882. It was set up in an H-shaped glass vessel with zinc amalgam in one leg and pure mercury, surmounted by a layer of mercurous sulfate paste, in the other. The vessel was filled, nearly to the top, with zinc sulfate solution. Electrical connections to the zinc amalgam and the mercury were made by platinum wires fused through the lower ends of the legs.

== Characteristics ==
The cell yields a reference EMF of 1.4328 volts at a temperature of 15 °C (288 K). Reference cells must be applied in such a way that no current is drawn from them. The design had two drawbacks—a rather large temperature coefficient of −1.15 mV/°C, and corrosion problems caused by the platinum wires alloying with the zinc amalgam connections where they enter the glass envelope.

In 1905, Clark cells were supplanted as a voltage standard by the more temperature-independent Weston cell.

== Sources ==
- Practical Electricity by W. E. Ayrton and T. Mather, published by Cassell and Company, London, 1911, pp 198–203

== See also ==
- List of battery types
