= Volt =

SI derived unit of voltage

volt
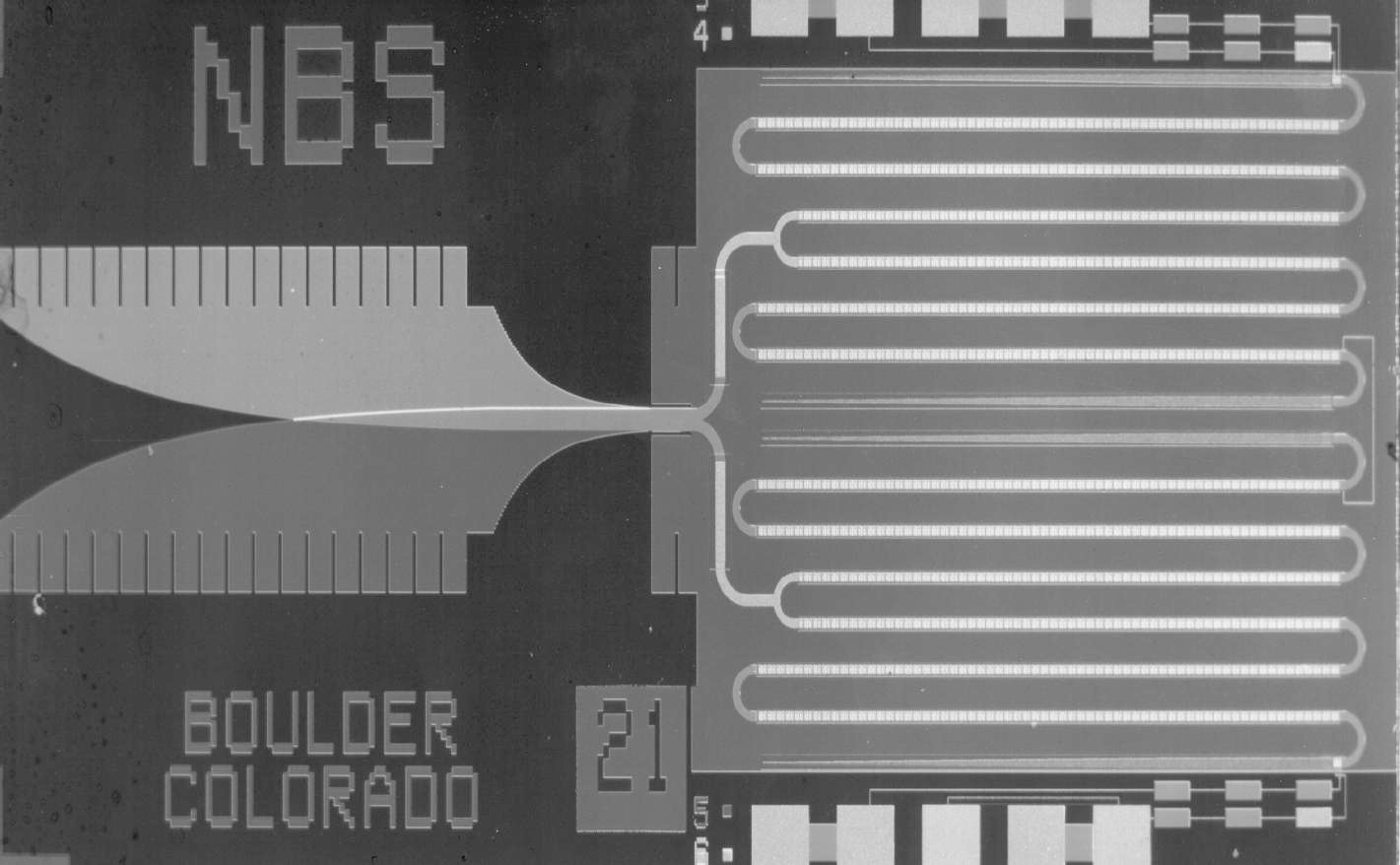
- Josephson voltage standard chip developed by the National Bureau of Standards as a standard volt

General information
- Unit system: SI
- Unit of: electric potential, electromotive force
- Symbol: V
- Named after: Alessandro Volta
- SI base units: kg⋅m^{2}⋅s^{−3}⋅A^{−1}

The volt (symbol: V), named after Alessandro Volta, is the unit of measurement of electric potential, electric potential difference (voltage), and electromotive force in the International System of Units (SI).

== Definition ==
One volt is defined as the electric potential between two points of a conducting wire when an electric current of one ampere dissipates one watt of power between those points. It can be expressed in terms of SI base units (m, kg, s, and A) as
$$\text{V} = \frac{\text{power}}{\text{electric current}} = \frac{\text{W}}{\text{A}} = \frac{\text{kg}{\cdot}\text{m}^2{\cdot}\text{s}^{-3}}{\text{A}} = \text{kg}{\cdot}\text{m}^2{\cdot}\text{s}^{-3}{\cdot}{\text{A}^{-1}}.$$

Equivalently, it is the potential difference between two points that will impart one joule of energy per coulomb of charge that passes through it. It can be expressed in terms of SI base units (m, kg, s, and A) as
$$\text{V} = \frac{\text{potential energy}}{\text{charge}} = \frac{\text{J}}{\text{C}} = \frac{\text{kg}{\cdot}\text{m}^2{\cdot}\text{s}^{-2}}{\text{A}{\cdot}\text{s}} = \text{kg}{\cdot}\text{m}^2{\cdot}\text{s}^{-3}{\cdot}{\text{A}^{-1}}.$$

It can also be expressed as amperes times ohms (current times resistance, Ohm's law), webers per second (magnetic flux per time), watts per ampere (power per current), or joules per coulomb (energy per charge), which is also equivalent to electronvolts per elementary charge:
$$\text{V} = \text{A}{\cdot}\Omega = \frac{\text{Wb}}{\text{s}} = \frac{\text{W}}{\text{A}} = \frac{\text{J}}{\text{C}} = \frac{\text{eV}}{e}.$$

The volt is named after Alessandro Volta. As with every SI unit named after a person, its symbol starts with an upper case letter (V), but when written in full, it follows the rules for capitalisation of a common noun; i.e., volt becomes capitalised at the beginning of a sentence and in titles but is otherwise in lower case.

=== Josephson junction definition ===
Historically the "conventional" volt, V_{90}, defined in 1987 by the 18th General Conference on Weights and Measures and in use from 1990 to 2019, was implemented using the Josephson effect for exact frequency-to-voltage conversion, combined with the caesium frequency standard. Though the Josephson effect is still used to realize a volt, the constant used has changed slightly.

For the Josephson constant, K_{J} = 2e/h (where e is the elementary charge and h is the Planck constant), a "conventional" value K_{J-90} = 0.4835979 GHz/μV was used for the purpose of defining the volt. As a consequence of the 2019 revision of the SI, as of 2019 the Josephson constant has an exact value of K_{J} = 483597.84841698... GHz/V, which replaced the conventional value K_{J-90}.

This standard is typically realized using a series-connected array of several thousand or tens of thousands of junctions, excited by microwave signals between 10 and 80 GHz (depending on the array design). Empirically, several experiments have shown that the method is independent of device design, material, measurement setup, etc., and no correction terms are required in a practical implementation.

== Water-flow analogy ==
In the water-flow analogy, sometimes used to explain electric circuits by comparing them with water-filled pipes, voltage (difference in electric potential) is likened to difference in water pressure, while current is proportional to the amount of water flowing. A resistor would be a reduced diameter somewhere in the piping or something akin to a radiator offering resistance to flow.

The relationship between voltage and current is defined (in ohmic devices like resistors) by Ohm's law. Ohm's law is analogous to the Hagen–Poiseuille equation, as both are linear models relating flux and potential in their respective systems.

== Common voltages ==
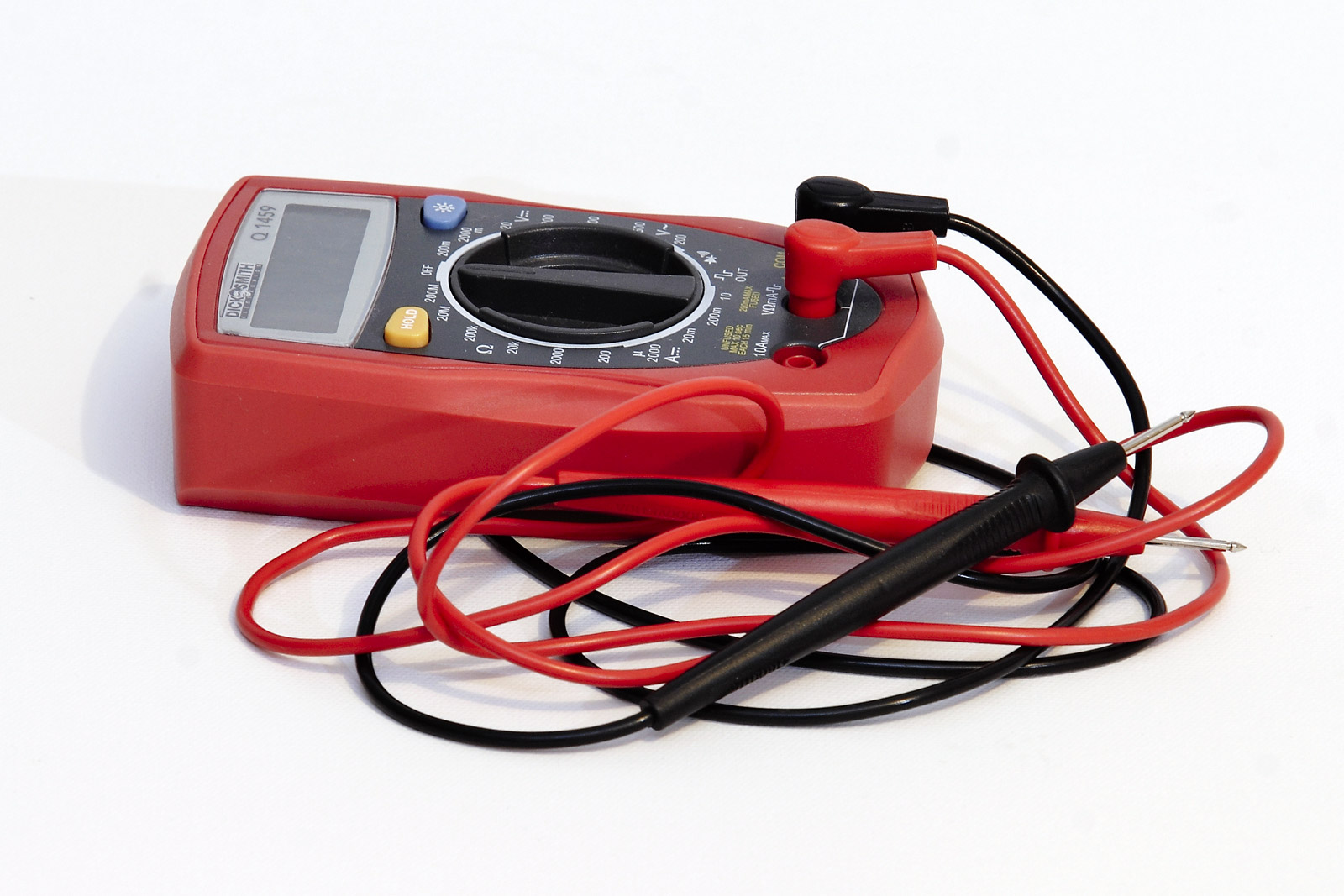
A multimeter can be used to measure the voltage between two positions.

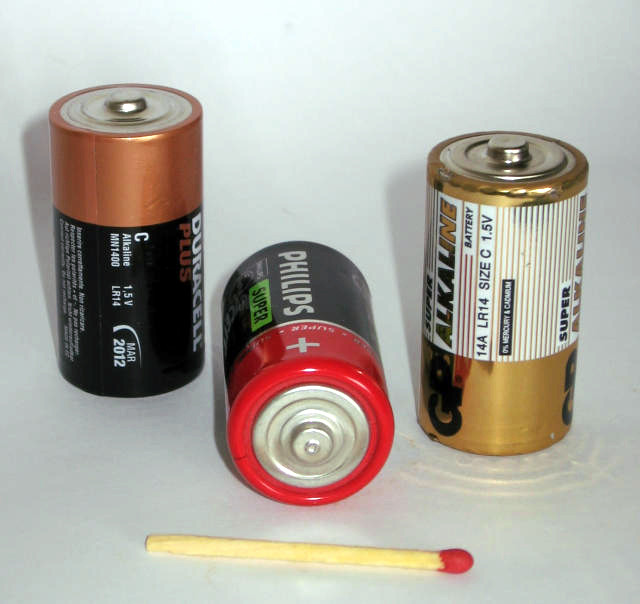
1.5 V C-cell batteries

The voltage produced by each electrochemical cell in a battery is determined by the chemistry of that cell (see Galvanic cell § Cell voltage). Cells can be combined in series for multiples of that voltage, or additional circuitry added to adjust the voltage to a different level. Mechanical generators can usually be constructed to any voltage in a range of feasibility.

Nominal voltages of familiar sources:

- Nerve cell resting potential: ~ 75 mV
- Single-cell, rechargeable NiMH or NiCd battery: 1.2 V; lead-acid rechargeable cell: 2.1V
- Single-cell, non-rechargeable (e.g., AAA, AA, C and D cells): alkaline battery: 1.5 V; zinc–carbon battery: 1.56 V if fresh and unused; Lithium coin cell: 3V
- Logic voltage levels: 1.2 V, 1.5 V, 1.8 V, 2.5 V, 3.3 V, 5.0 V
- LiFePO_{4} rechargeable battery: 3.3 V
- Cobalt-based lithium polymer rechargeable battery: 3.75 V (see Comparison of commercial battery types)
- Transistor–transistor logic/CMOS (TTL) power supply: 5 V
- USB: 5 V DC
- PP3 battery: 9 V
- Automotive battery systems use cells with 2.1 volts per cell; a "12 V" battery has six cells connected in series, which produces 12.6 V; a "24 V" battery has 12 cells connected in series, producing 25.2 V. Some antique vehicles use "6 V" 3-cell batteries, or 6.3 volts.
- Household mains electricity AC (see Mains electricity by country for a list of countries with mains power plugs, voltages and frequencies)
  - 100 V in Japan
  - 120 V in North America
  - 230 V in Europe, Asia, Africa and Australia
- Rapid transit third rail: 600–750 V (see List of railway electrification systems)
- High-speed train overhead power lines: 25 kV at 50 Hz, but see the List of railway electrification systems and 25 kV at 60 Hz for exceptions.
- High-voltage electric power transmission lines: 110 kV and up (1.15 MV is the record; the highest active voltage is 1.10 MV)
- Lightning: a maximum of around 150 MV.

== History ==
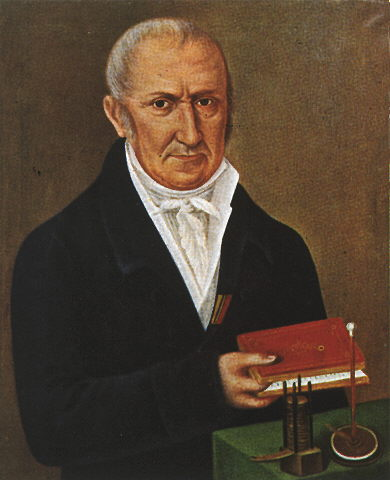
Alessandro Volta

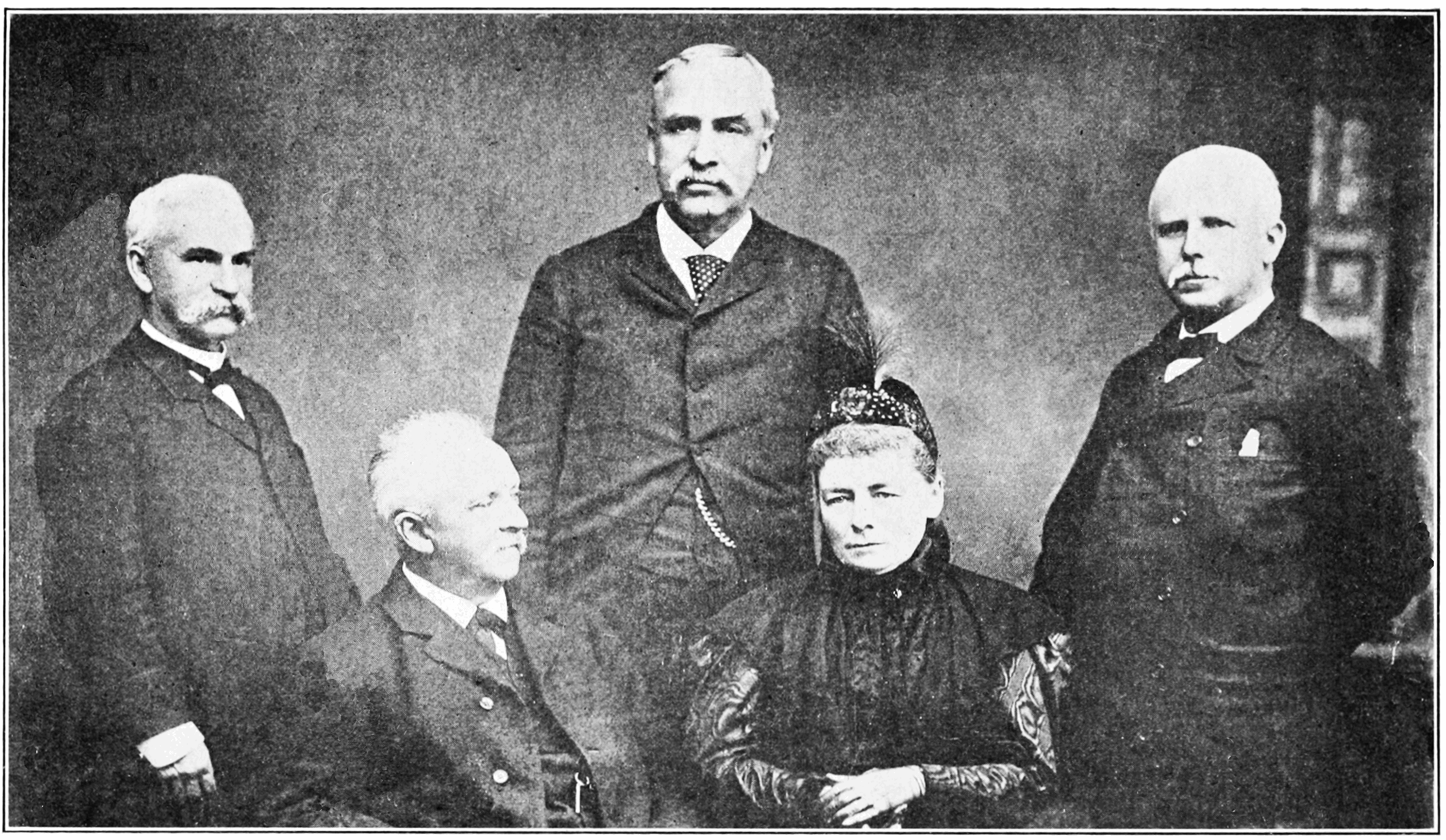
Group photograph of Hermann Helmholtz, his wife (seated) and academic friends Hugo Kronecker (left), Thomas Corwin Mendenhall (right), Henry Villard (center) during the International Electrical Congress

In 1800, as the result of a professional disagreement over the galvanic response advocated by Luigi Galvani, Alessandro Volta developed the so-called voltaic pile, a forerunner of the battery, which produced a steady electric current. Volta had determined that the most effective pair of dissimilar metals to produce electricity was zinc and silver. In 1861, Latimer Clark and Sir Charles Bright coined the name "volt" for the unit of resistance. By 1873, the British Association for the Advancement of Science had defined the volt, ohm, and farad. In 1881, the International Electrical Congress, now the International Electrotechnical Commission (IEC), approved the volt as the unit for electromotive force. They made the volt equal to 10^{8} cgs units of voltage, the cgs system at the time being the customary system of units in science. They chose such a ratio because the cgs unit of voltage is inconveniently small and one volt in this definition is approximately the emf of a Daniell cell, the standard source of voltage in the telegraph systems of the day. At that time, the volt was defined as the potential difference [i.e., what is nowadays called the "voltage (difference)"] across a conductor when a current of one ampere dissipates one watt of power.

The "international volt" was defined in 1893 as 1/1.434 of the emf of a Clark cell. This definition was abandoned in 1908 in favor of a definition based on the international ohm and international ampere until the entire set of "reproducible units" was abandoned in 1948.

A 2019 revision of the SI, including defining the value of the elementary charge, took effect on 20 May 2019.

== See also ==
- Orders of magnitude (voltage)
- Rail traction voltage
- SI electromagnetism units
- SI prefix for unit prefixes
- Standardised railway voltages
- Voltmeter
