= Giuseppe Zamboni =

Italian Roman Catholic priest and physicist (1776–1846)

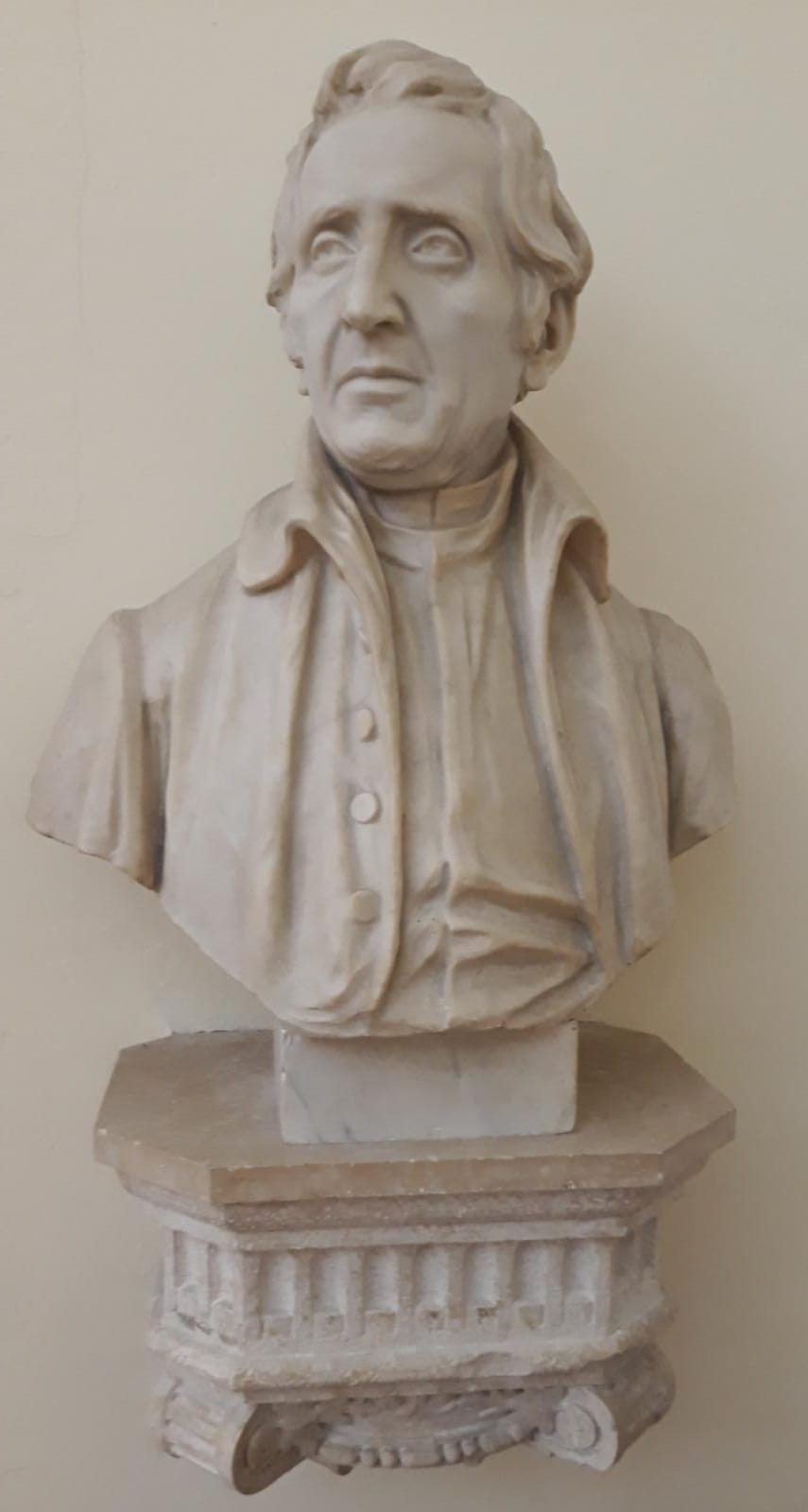
- Giuseppe Zamboni
- Born: 1 June 1776; Arbizzano, Republic of Venice
- Died: 25 July 1846 (aged 70); Verona, Lombardy-Venetia, Austrian Empire
- Known for: Invention of the Zamboni pile; Invention of the electric clock
- Parent(s): Luigi Zamboni and Caterina Zamboni (née Rensi)
- Scientific career
- Fields: Physics and chemistry

Giuseppe Zamboni (June 1, 1776 – July 25, 1846) was an Italian Roman Catholic priest and physicist who invented the Zamboni pile, an early electric battery similar to the voltaic pile.

== Biography ==
Giuseppe Zamboni was born on June 1, 1776, in Arbizzano, a small village at the foothills of Verona in northern Italy. He first studied in the Seminary of Verona, eventually securing ecclesiastical qualifications entitling him to the appellation of Abbot, however, on finishing these studies he applied for, and obtained, the Chair of Philosophy in the Municipal School of S. Sebastiano, then considered to be the University of Verona. Zamboni decided to take up the study of physics, eventually resigning his seat in philosophy. After qualifying, he became a Professor of Physics in 1805, and taught in the Royal Classical School of Verona. Later he became interested in the subject of electricity, then only a mere branch of physics, the first publication of his work being entitled Della pila elettrica a secco (Of the dry electric pile), published in Verona in 1812. It was also the first of many works on the subject of the dry electric pile written by Zamboni.

Zamboni was able to devise a pile that could move a light pendulum for a very long period of time. The pendulum was mounted between the oppositely charged poles of two piles placed side by side, and went into oscillation because of the alternating attraction and repulsion it experienced. The description of this “electromotive perpetual pendulum” was published extensively after it appeared in Luigi Valentino Brugnatelli's Giornale di fisica in December 1812 and the following January. In 1814 Zamboni modified the pendulum, creating one of the first electric clocks. In 1815 he presented his device to the Royal Society of London. Zamboni's instrument was described in the Royal Society's January 1815 report. The instrument is mentioned in a letter from Sir Joseph Banks to Francis Ronalds. Ronalds visited Zamboni’s laboratory in Verona in 1820 during his Grand Tour, and again in 1858 where he admired a clock that had been running for fifteen years.

Perpetual motion was of particular interest to Zamboni and this theme runs through much of his work. In his defence it may be noted here that the principle of the conservation of energy was then unknown, and the dry pile seemed an inexhaustible source of electrical energy. Zamboni's piles, because of their improved design and method of construction, were more powerful and permanent in their effects than any others previously constructed. It seems worth recording here that the Zamboni pile is really "dry" apart from the water present in the paper discs by reason of the hygroscopic nature and absorption powers of paper which attracts moisture from the air; and not "dry" in the sense of an ordinary modern cell or battery designed for portable use, where the electrolyte is merely made stiff by gelling, or is stabilised by storage in a porous membrane.

Zamboni was a member of many learned Societies, such as the Bavarian Academy of Sciences and Humanities, the Accademia nazionale delle scienze, and the Istituto Lombardo Accademia di Scienze e Lettere. In 1822 he traveled to Paris, where he befriended several notable scientific personalities of the time, such André-Marie Ampère, François Arago and Augustin-Jean Fresnel, and lectured to the French Academy of Sciences. He was a lifelong friend and correspondent of Alessandro Volta and was held in very great respect by his contemporaries, as is evidenced by the eulogies published after his death in Verona on July 25, 1846.

== Invention ==
Zamboni's pendulum (click to animate)

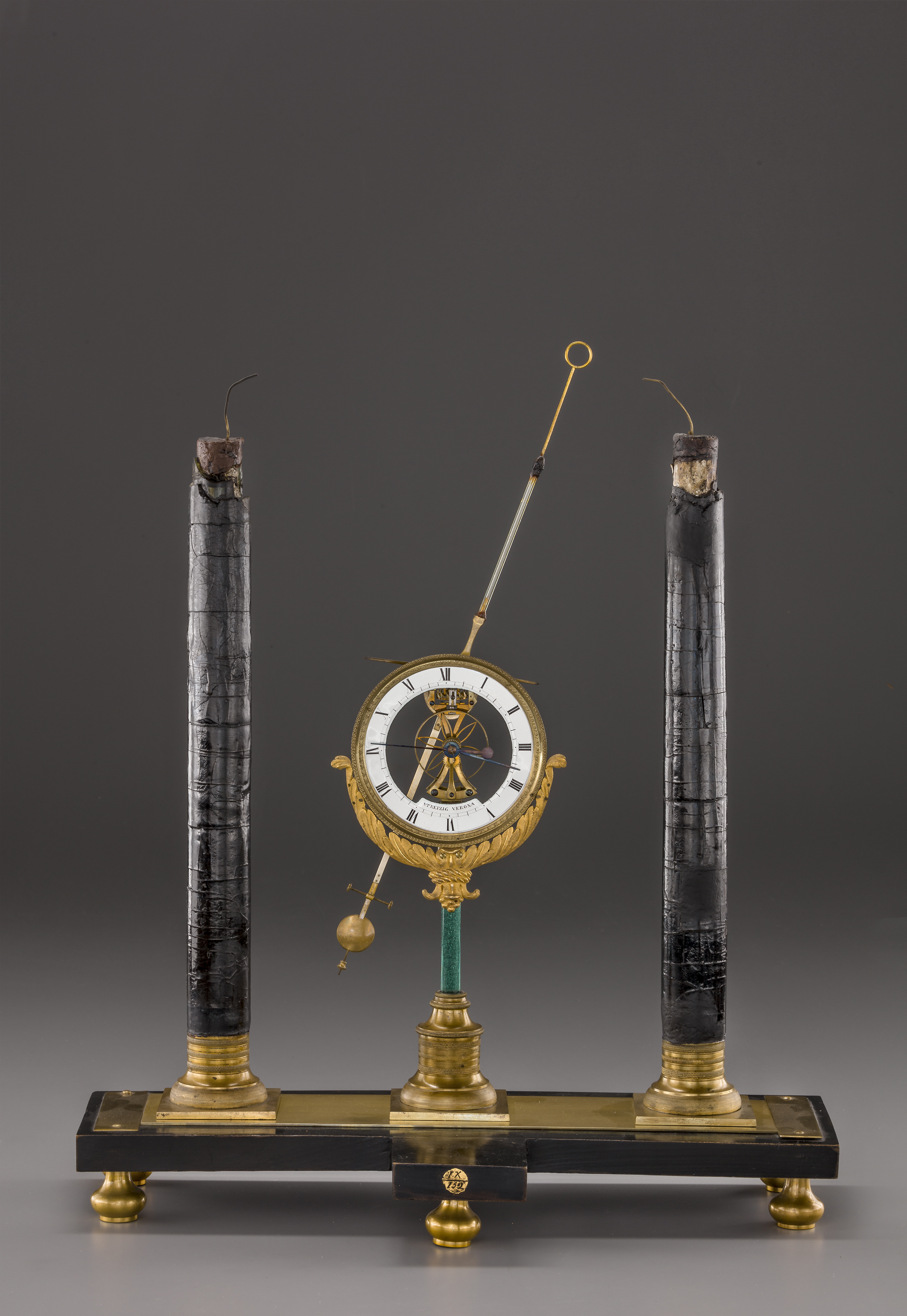
The "perpetual" clock, Museo Civico di Modena

Zamboni is known to students of physics for an improved version of the dry pile (an electric battery which does not use an electrolyte) which he invented in 1812. It consists of a number of paper discs coated with zinc foil on one side and manganese dioxide on the other; the moisture of the paper serves as a conductor.

By pressing a large number of such discs together in a glass tube, an electromotive force can be obtained that is sufficient to deflect the leaves of an ordinary electroscope. By bringing the terminal knobs of the pile near each other and suspending a light brass ball between them, Zamboni devised what was called an electrostatic clock. The device is so named because the ball oscillating between the knobs looks like a pendulum.

In the Oxford Electric Bell experiment at the Clarendon Laboratory at Oxford University, the terminals of what is believed to be such a pile are fitted with bells that have been continuously ringing since the device was set up in 1840. Note that the Zamboni pile is not a hypothetical perpetual motion device, as all action will eventually cease when the zinc is completely oxidized or the manganese exhausted.

== Writings ==
- Della pila elettrica a secco. Verona: Dionigio Ramanzini. 1812.
- Descrizione ed uso dell'elettromotore perpetuo. Verona: Tipografia Mainardi. 1814.
- L'elettromotore perpetuo. Trattato diviso in due parti. 2 vols. Verona: Tipografia Erede Merlo. 1820–1822.
- Sull'elettro motore perpetuo, istruzione teorico-pratica. Verona: Tipografia Antonelli. 1843.

== See also ==
- List of Roman Catholic scientist-clerics

== Bibliography ==
- This article incorporates text from a publication now in the public domain: Herbermann, Charles, ed. (1913). "Giuseppe Zamboni". Catholic Encyclopedia. New York: Robert Appleton Company.
- Aked, Charles C. (1973). "The First Electric Clock". Antiquarian Horology. 8 (3): 276–89.
- Tinazzi, Massimo (1996). "Perpetual Electromotive of Giuseppe Zamboni". Atti del XVI congresso nazionale della Società italiana degli storici della fisica e dell'astronomia: 667–715. Archived from the original on 19 February 2016.
- Forlati, Paolo (2000). "Gli orologi elettrici con pile Zamboni: i primi al mondo". Atti e Memorie dell'Accademia di Agricoltura Scienze e Lettere di Verona. CLXXIII: 55–64.
- Hackmann, Willem (2001). "The enigma of Volta's 'contact tension' and the development of the 'dry pile'". Nuova Voltiana: Studies on Volta and His Times. III. Milan: 103–119.
- Tinazzi, Massimo (2004). "The correspondence between Alessandro Volta and Giuseppe Zamboni about the realization of the "dry pile"". Nuova Voltiana: Studies on Volta and His Times. V. Milan: 91–103.
- Mantovani, Roberto; Negrini, Fiamma (2012). "Zamboni e i suoi strumenti: le origini della collezione storica del liceo ginnasio "Scipione Maffei" di Verona". Atti del XXX congresso nazionale della Società italiana degli storici della fisica e dell'astronomia. Urbino: 317–334.
- Ronalds, B.F. (June 2015). "Remembering the First Battery-Operated Clock". Antiquarian Horology. 36 (2): 248–244.
- Macuglia, Daniele (2020). "ZAMBONI, Giuseppe". Dizionario Biografico degli Italiani (in Italian). Vol. 100: Vittorio Emanuele I–Zurlo. Rome: Istituto dell'Enciclopedia Italiana. ISBN 978-88-12-00032-6.
