= Electric clock =

Clock powered by electricity

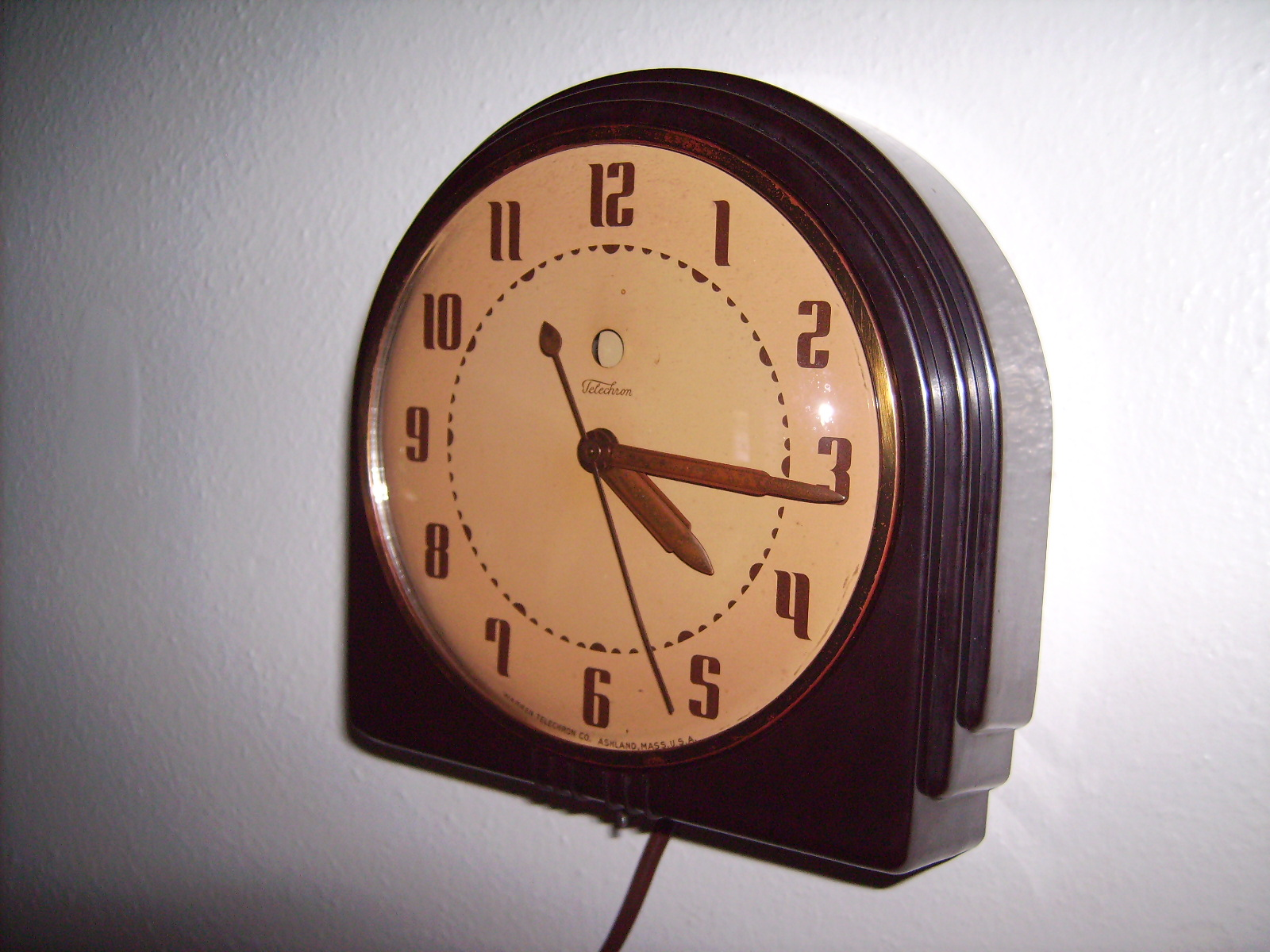
Telechron synchronous electric clock manufactured around 1940. By 1940, the synchronous clock became the most common type of clock in the United States

An electric clock is a clock that is powered by electricity, as opposed to a mechanical clock which is powered by a hanging weight or a mainspring. The term is often applied to the electrically powered mechanical clocks that were used before quartz clocks were introduced in the 1980s. The first experimental electric clocks were constructed around the 1840s, but they were not widely manufactured until mains electric power became available in the 1890s. In the 1930s, the synchronous electric clock replaced mechanical clocks as the most widely used type of clock.

== Types ==
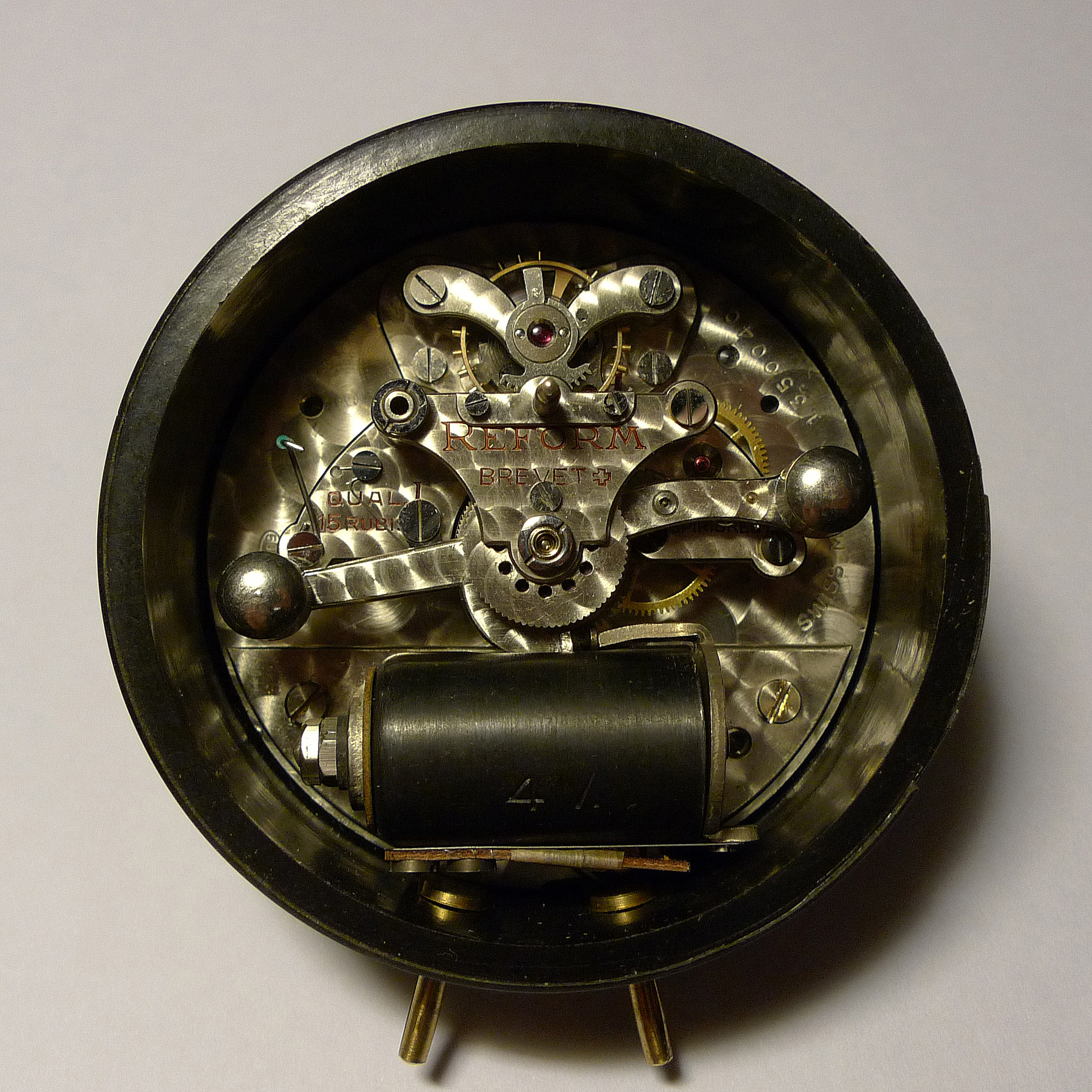
Electromechanical self-winding clock movement from Switzerland.

Electric clocks can operate by several different types of mechanism:

Electromechanical clocks
These have a traditional mechanical movement, which keeps time with an oscillating pendulum or balance wheel powered through a gear train by a mainspring, but use electricity to rewind the mainspring with an electric motor or electromagnet. This mechanism is found mostly in antique clocks.
Electric remontoire clocks
These have gear trains turned by a small spring or weighted lever, called a remontoire, which was wound up more frequently by an electric motor or electromagnet. This mechanism was more accurate than a mainspring, because the frequent winding averaged out variations in the clock's rate caused by the varying force of the spring as it unwound. It was used in precision pendulum clocks, and in automotive clocks until the 1970s.
Electromagnetic clocks
These keep time with a pendulum or balance wheel, but the pulses to keep it going are not provided by a mechanical movement and escapement linkage, but by magnetic force from an electromagnet (solenoid). This was the mechanism used in the first electric clocks, and is found in antique electric pendulum clocks. It is also found in a few modern decorative mantel and desk clocks.
Synchronous clocks
These rely on the 50 or 60 Hz utility frequency of the AC electric power grid as a timing source, by driving the clock gears with a synchronous motor. They essentially count cycles of the power supply. While the actual frequency may vary with loading on the grid, the total number of cycles per 24 hours is maintained rigorously constant, so that these clocks can keep time accurately for long periods, barring power cuts; over months they are more accurate than a typical quartz clock. This was the most common type of clock from the 1930s but has now been mostly replaced by quartz clocks.
Tuning Fork clocks
These keep time by counting the oscillations of a calibrated tuning fork with a specific frequency. These were only made in battery-powered form. Battery-powered clocks have been made using the schemes above with the obvious exception of a synchronous movement. All battery-powered clocks have been largely replaced by the lower cost quartz movement.
Quartz clocks
These are electric clocks which keep time by counting oscillations of a vibrating quartz crystal. They use modern low-voltage DC-powered circuitry, which may be supplied by a battery or derived from mains electricity. They are the most common type of clock today. Quartz clocks and watches as supplied by the manufacturer typically keep time with an error of a few seconds per week, although sometimes more. Inexpensive quartz movements are often specified to keep time within 30 seconds per month (1 second per day, 6 minutes per year). Lower error can be achieved by individual calibration if adjustment is possible, subject to the stability of the oscillator, particularly with change in temperature. Higher accuracy is possible at higher cost.
Radio-controlled clocks
These are quartz clocks which are periodically synchronized with the UTC atomic clock time scale via radio time signals broadcast by dedicated stations around the world. They are distinct from clock radios.

== History ==
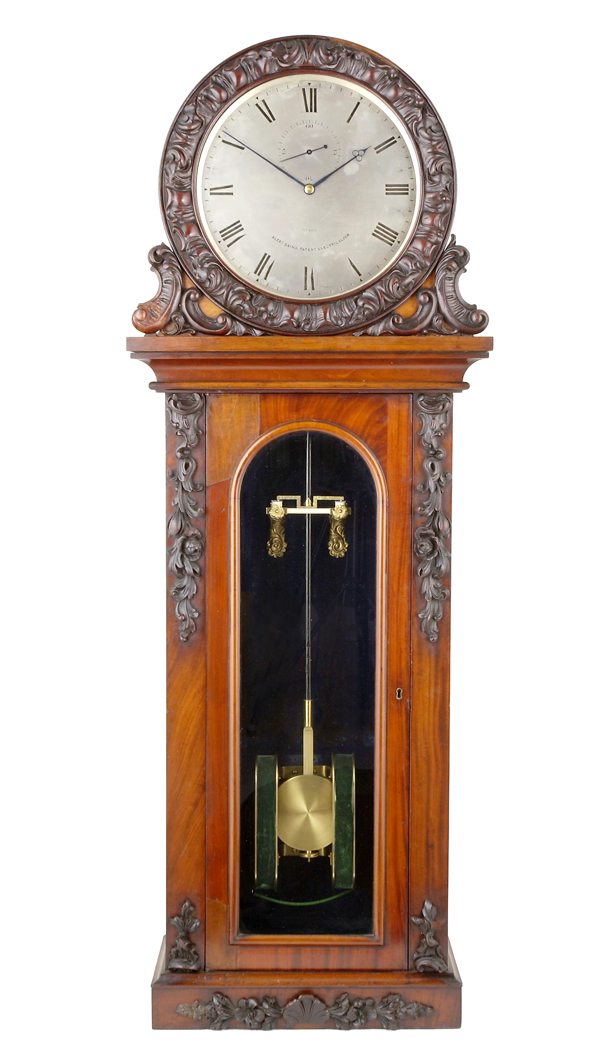
One of Alexander Bain's early electromagnetic clocks, from the 1840s

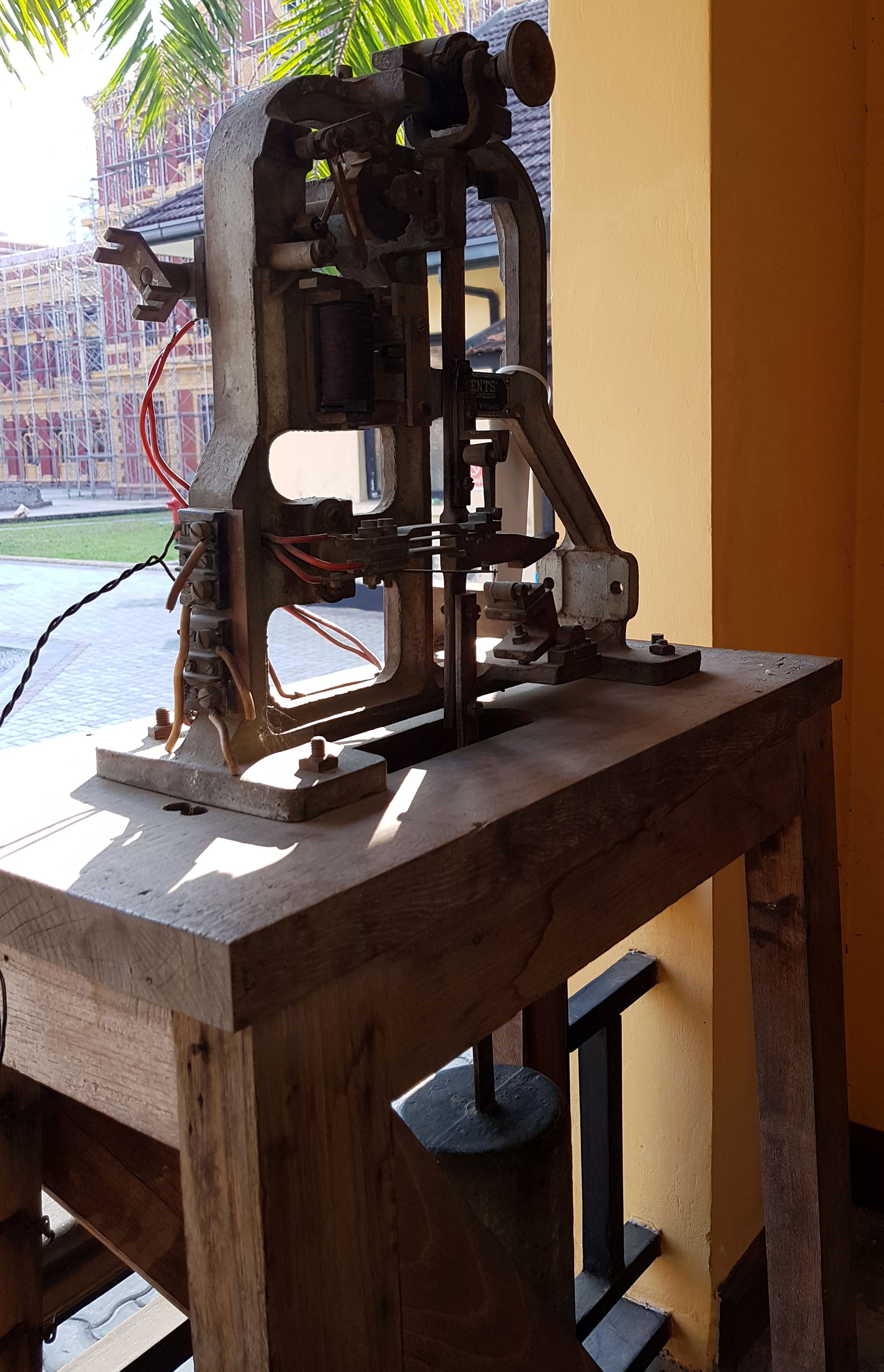
Gents' of Leicester Pulsynetic, C40A, Waiting Train, Turret Clock (1940s/50?). Photographed in the Ministers' Building (The Secretariat), Yangon.

In 1814, Sir Francis Ronalds of London invented the first electric clock. It was powered with dry piles, a high voltage battery with extremely long life but the disadvantage of its electrical properties varying with the weather. He trialled various means of regulating the electricity and these models proved to be reliable across a range of meteorological conditions.

In 1815, Giuseppe Zamboni of Verona invented and showed another electrostatic clock run with dry pile batteries and an oscillating orb. His team produced improved clocks over many years, which were later denoted as "the most elegant and at the same time the most simple movement yet produced by the electric column". Zamboni's clock had a vertical needle supported by a pivot and was so energy efficient that it could operate on one battery for over 50 years.

In 1840, Alexander Bain, a Scottish clock and instrument maker was the first to invent and patent a clock powered by electric current. His original electric clock patent is dated October 10, 1840. On January 11, 1841, Alexander Bain along with John Barwise, a chronometer maker, took out another important patent describing a clock in which an electromagnetic pendulum and an electric current is employed to keep the clock going instead of springs or weights. Later patents expanded on his original ideas.

Numerous people were intent on inventing the electric clock with electromechanical and electromagnetic designs around the year 1840, such as Wheatstone, Steinheil, Hipp, Breguet, and Garnier, both in Europe and America.

Matthäus Hipp, a clockmaker born in Germany, is credited with establishing the production series, mass marketable electric clock. Hipp opened a workshop in Reutlingen, where he developed the first electric clock to incorporate the Hipp-Toggle escapement, which he had first presented in Berlin, used in a mechanical clock, at an exhibition in 1843. The Hipp-Toggle is a device attached to a pendulum or balance wheel that electro-mechanically allows occasional impulse or drive to the pendulum or wheel as its amplitude of swing drops below a certain level, and is so efficient that it was subsequently used in electric clocks for over a hundred years. Hipp also invented a small motor and built the chronoscope and the registering chronograph for time measurement.

The first electric clocks had prominent pendulums because this was a familiar shape and design. Smaller clocks and watches with a spiral-balance are made on the same principles as pendulum clocks.

In 1918, Henry Ellis Warren invented the first synchronous electric clock in Ashland, MA, which kept time from the oscillations of the power grid. In 1931, the Synclock was the first commercial synchronous electric clock sold in the UK.

== Electromechanical clock ==
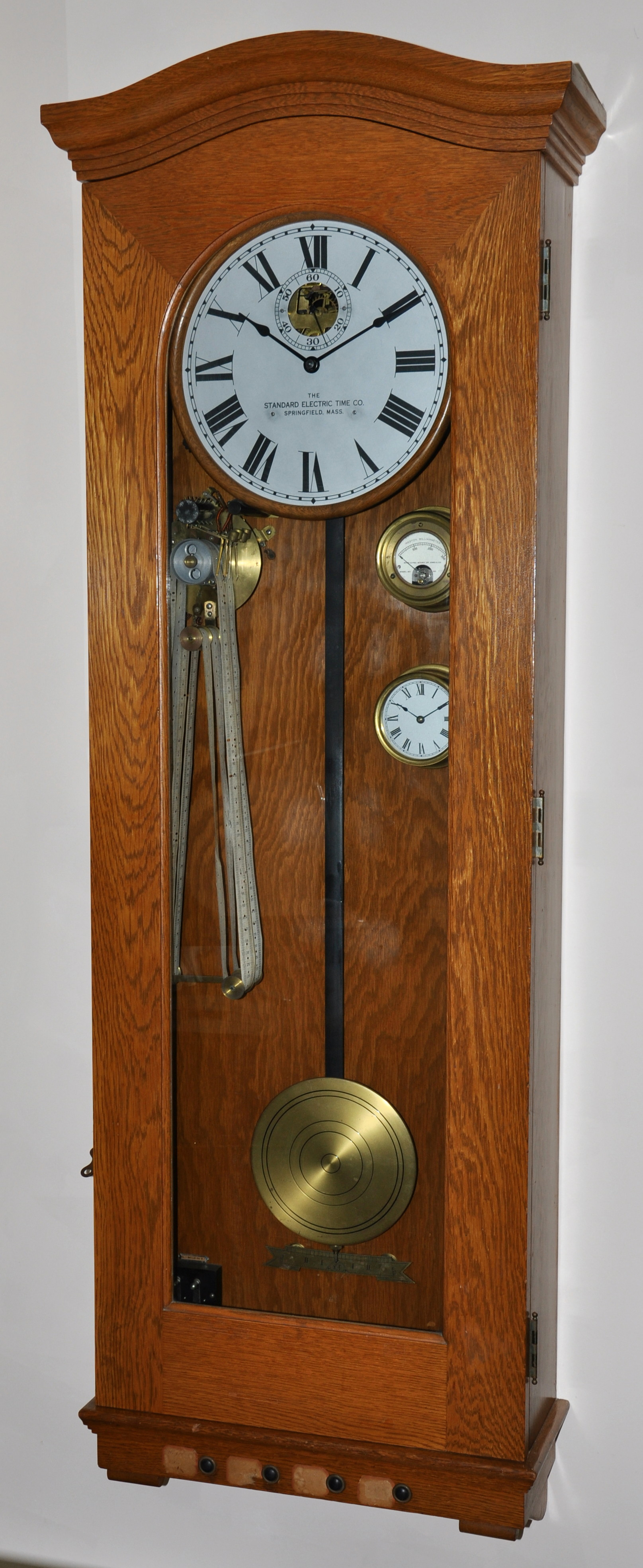
Master clock from synchronized school clock system. c.1928 Electromechanical movement winds each minute and impulses slave clocks each minute. Operates on 24 Volts DC

A clock that employs electricity in some form to power a conventional clock mechanism is an electromechanical clock. Any spring or weight driven clock that uses electricity (either AC or DC) to rewind the spring or raise the weight of a mechanical clock then is an electromechanical clock. In electromechanical clocks the electricity serves no time keeping function. The timekeeping function is regulated by the pendulum. Near the end of the nineteenth century, the availability of the dry cell battery made it practical to use electric power in clocks. The use of electricity then led to many variations of clock and motor designs. Electromechanical clocks were made as individual timepieces but most commonly were used as integral parts of synchronized time installations. Experience in telegraphy led to connecting remote clocks (slave clocks) via wires to a controlling (master clock) clock. The goal was to create a clock system where each clock displayed exactly the same time. The master and the slaves are electromechanical clocks. The master clock has a conventional self-winding clock mechanism that is rewound electrically. The slave clock mechanism is not a conventional clock mechanism as it consists only of a ratchet wheel and time train. Slave clocks rely upon electrical impulses from the master clock to mechanically move the clock hands one unit of time. Synchronized time systems are made up of one master clock and any number of slave clocks. The slave clocks are connected by wires to the master clock. These systems are found in locations where multiple clocks would be used such as learning institutions, businesses, factories, transportation networks, banks, offices and government facilities. A notable example of this type of system is the Shortt-Synchronome clock, which is an example of an electromechanical gravity remontoire. These self-winding clock systems were usually low voltage DC. They were installed through the 1950s and by then systems with synchronous motor clocks were becoming the clock system of choice.

== Electromagnetic clock ==
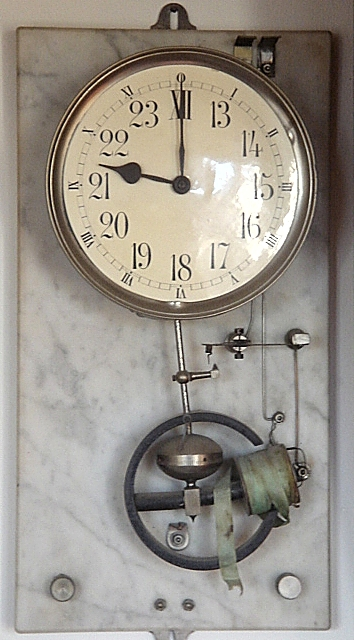
Early French electromagnetic clock

The configuration of this device is comparatively very simple and reliable. The electric current powers either a pendulum or an electromechanical oscillator.

The electromechanical oscillator component has an attached magnet that passes two inductors. When the magnet passes the first inductor or sensor, the simple amplifier causes the current through the second inductor, and the second inductor works as an electromagnet, providing an energy pulse to the moving oscillator. This oscillator is responsible for the accuracy of the clock. The electronic part would not generate electrical pulses if the oscillator was absent or did not move. The resonant frequency of the mechanical oscillator should be several times per second.

== Synchronous electric clock ==
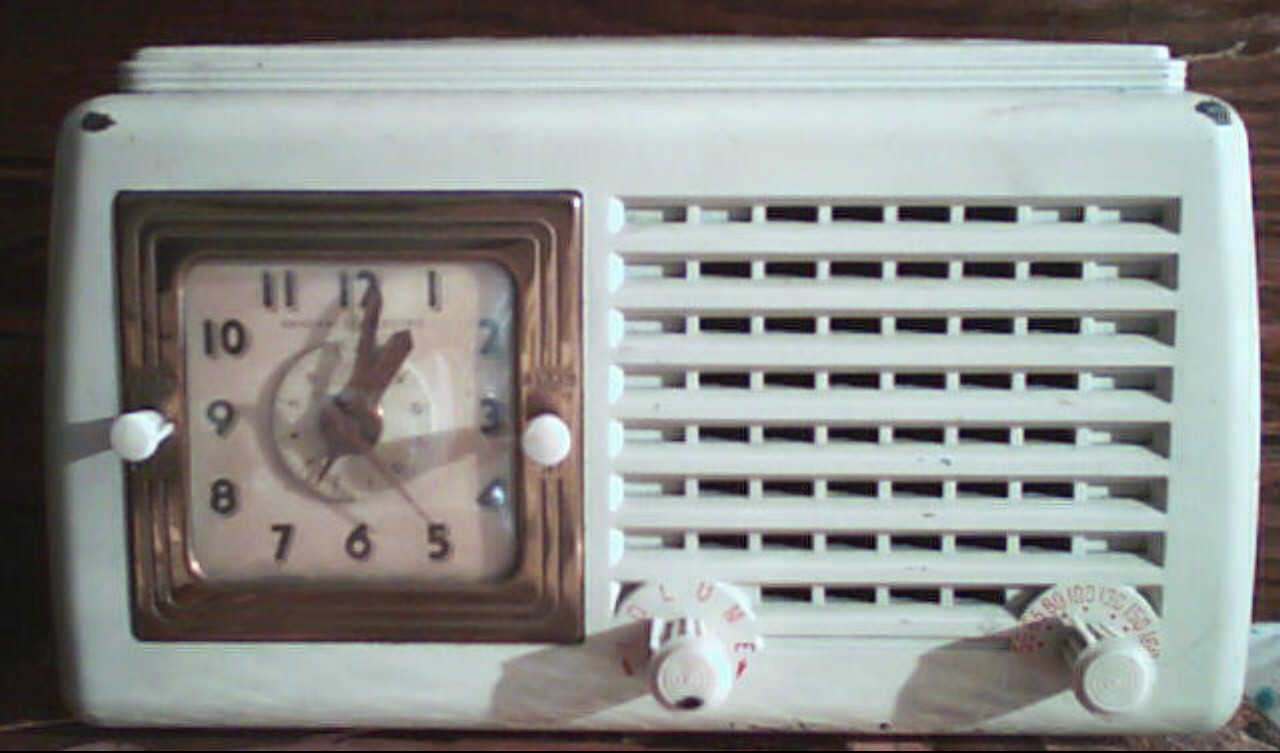
Clock radio with synchronous clock, from the 1950s

A synchronous electric clock does not contain a timekeeping oscillator such as a pendulum or balance wheel, but instead counts the oscillations of the AC utility current from its wall plug to keep time. It consists of a small AC synchronous motor, which turns the clock's hands through a reduction gear train. The motor contains electromagnets which create a rotating magnetic field which turns an iron rotor. The rotation rate of the motor shaft is synchronized to the utility frequency; 60 cycles per second (Hz) in North America and parts of South America, 50 cycles per second in most other countries. The gear train scales this rotation so the minute hand rotates once per hour. Thus the synchronous clock can be regarded as not so much a timekeeper as a mechanical counter, whose hands display a running count of the number of cycles of alternating current.

One of the gears turning the clock's hands has a shaft with a sliding friction fitting, so the clock's hands can be turned manually by a knob on the back or on the bottom, to set the clock.

Synchronous motor clocks are rugged because they do not have a delicate pendulum or balance wheel. However, a temporary power outage will stop the clock, which will show the wrong time when power is restored. Some synchronous clocks (e.g. Telechron) have an indicator which shows if it has stopped and restarted.

=== Number of poles ===
Some electric clocks have a simple two-pole synchronous motor which runs at one revolution per cycle of power, i.e., 3600 RPM at 60 Hz and 3000 RPM at 50 Hz. However most electric clocks have rotors with more magnetic poles (teeth), consequently rotating at a smaller submultiple of line frequency. This allows the gear train which turns the hands to be built with fewer gears, saving money.

=== Accuracy ===
The accuracy of synchronous clocks depends on how close electric utilities keep the frequency of their current to the nominal value of 50 or 60 hertz. Although utility load variations cause frequency fluctuations which may result in errors of a few seconds during the course of a day, utilities periodically adjust the frequency of their current using UTC atomic clock time so that the total number of cycles in a day gives an average frequency that is exactly the nominal value, so synchronous clocks do not accumulate error. For example, European utilities control the frequency of their grid once a day to make the total number of cycles in 24 hours correct. U.S. utilities correct their frequency once the cumulative error has reached 3–10 sec. This correction is known as the Time Error Correction (TEC).

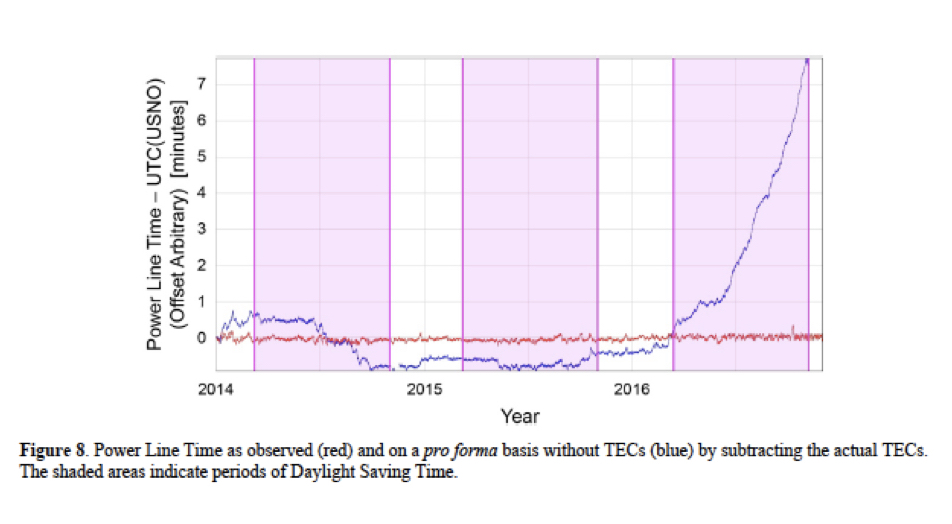
The over 7-minute time error that would have developed in electric clocks over much of N. America had they not been reset after the March 2016 switch to Daylight Saving Time, and had TEC's not been utilized

In 2011, the North American Electric Reliability Corporation (NERC), a consensus-based industry organization, petitioned the Federal Energy Regulatory Commission (FERC) to eliminate the TEC. While this would have freed the power companies from the threat of fines and also provided an extremely modest increase in frequency stability, it was also noted that synchronous clocks, which include wall clocks, alarm clocks, and other clocks computing the time on the basis of their electrical power, would accumulate several minutes of error between the semi-annual resets for Daylight Saving Time. This consequence was reported in the American news media, and the initiative was dropped. However, in late 2016 a similar proposal was again filed by the NERC to the FERC, which was approved two months later. It is contingent upon the removal of the standard WEQ-006, and the NERC also petitioned the North American Energy Standard Board (NAESB), a non-governmental organization that is business-oriented, for removing that standard. If the FERC adopts the NAESB petition, TECs will no longer be utilized in the United States and Canada, and clocks timed by them will likely wander uncontrolled until manually reset, however as of 2021 WEQ-006 was still in place. It was noted in a technical paper by employees of the National Institute of Standards and Technology and the U.S. Naval Observatory that, had TECs not been inserted in 2016, there would have been over seven minutes lost by electrically timed clocks over much of the United States and Canada, as shown in Figure 8 of their paper.

=== Spin-start clocks ===
The earliest synchronous clocks from the 1930s were not self-starting, and had to be started by spinning a starter knob on the back. A flaw in the design of these spin-start clocks was that the motor could be started in either direction, so if the starter knob was spun the wrong way the clock would run backwards, the hands turning counterclockwise. Later manual-start clocks had ratchets or other linkages which prevented backwards starting. The invention of the shaded-pole motor allowed self-starting clocks to be made, but since the clock would then restart after a power outage, the clock would give incorrect time instead of being stopped at the time of power interruption.

== See also ==
- Master clock
- Shortt-Synchronome clock
- Automatic watch
