= Contact potential =

Contact potential may refer to:

- Contact potential, a voltage generated; See Electromotive force
  - Galvani potential, at a junction of two metals
  - Volta potential, between two points in vacuum near surfaces of two metals in contact
- Contact electrification, a charge transfer process
- Contact tension, a term used in an early explanation of batteries
