= Clock network =

Set of clocks that synchronized to same time

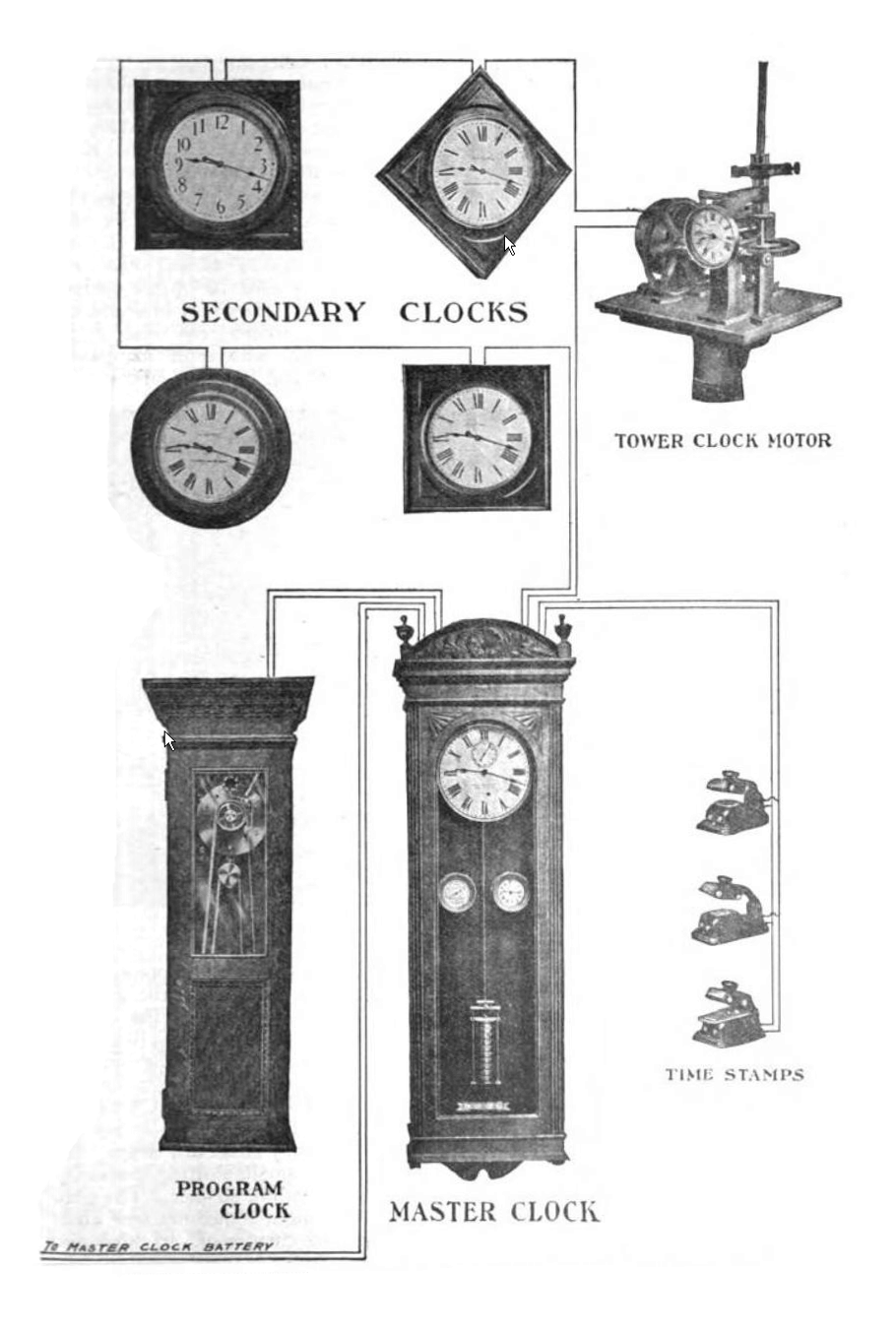
Diagram of electric time system used around 1910 to keep time in factories, schools, and other large institutions. The master clock, controlled by a temperature-compensated mercury pendulum, is wired to slave clocks throughout the building. In addition to wall clocks, it also controls time stamps that are used to stamp documents with the time, and a turret clock that is installed in a clock tower. The "program clock" is a timer that can be programmed with punched paper tape to ring bells or turn machines on and off at preprogrammed times.

A clock network or clock system is a set of synchronized clocks designed to always show exactly the same time by communicating with each other. Clock networks usually consist of a central master clock kept in sync with an official time source, and one or more slave clocks which receive and display the time from the master.

== Synchronization sources ==
The master clock in a clock network can receive accurate time in a number of ways: through the United States GPS satellite constellation, a Network Time Protocol server, the CDMA cellular phone network, a modem connection to a time source, or by listening to radio transmissions from WWV or WWVH, or a special signal from an upstream broadcast network. Some master clocks do not determine the time automatically. Instead, they rely on an operator to manually set them.

Clock networks in critical applications often include a backup source to receive the time, or provisions to allow the master clock to maintain the time even if it loses access to its primary time source. For example, many master clocks can use the reliable frequency of the alternating current line they are connected to.

== Slave clocks ==
Slave clocks come in many shapes and sizes. They can connect to the master clock through either a cable or a short-range wireless signal. Between the late 19th and early 20th centuries, Paris used a series of pneumatic tubes to transmit the signal. Some slave clocks will run independently if they lose the master signal, often with a warning light lit. Others will freeze until the connection is restored.

== Clock synchronization ==
Many master clocks include the capability to synchronize devices like computers to the master clock signal. Common features include the transmission of the time via RS-232, a Network Time Protocol, or a Pulse Per Second (PPS) contact. Others provide SMPTE time code outputs, which are often used in television settings to synchronize the video from multiple sources. Master Clocks often come equipped with programmable relay outputs to synchronize other devices such as lights, doors, etc.

== Applications ==
One of the driving factors in developing clock networks was the broadcast industry. Television, in particular, operates on a very strict schedule, where each second of airtime is planned ahead of time and must be executed precisely. A central clock system allows a television station's master control and production personnel to work within that schedule. A clock network synchronized to the standard UTC time also allows different television facilities to coordinate their activities without complicated out-of-band signaling. It also provides accurate timing to equipment in stations that are becoming increasingly automated.

While television broadcasters were some of the first users of clock networks, the equipment is becoming increasingly useful in other industries. For example, the National Emergency Number Association issued directive NENA-04-002, offering standards in timekeeping for 911 dispatch centers throughout the United States. Other common clock network users include airports and schools.

== History ==
One of the first clock networks was installed by Charles Shepherd for the Great Exhibition, held in London in 1851. Shepherd's technology was then installed at the Royal Greenwich Observatory, and a replica of his Shepherd Gate Clock outside the gate is still working, the original being severely damaged in a WWII air raid.

In the period before the universal availability of A.C. mains or atomic clocks, many clock networks were installed using a highly accurate pendulum clock as a master clock. This clock resembled a longcase clock, but had a very robust mechanism and a less ornate case. Electrical contacts attached to the mechanism generated minute, half minute and sometimes one second electrical pulses which were fed to the slave clocks on pairs of wires. The devices driven could be wall clocks, employee time clocks, tower clocks and occasionally clock chiming mechanisms. Some master clocks were set up to control the frequency of a generating authority's mains output; others, in the UK, were arranged to synchronise themselves with the Greenwich Time Signal pips.

== Clock strata ==
There is a hierarchy of clocks in a network, reflecting their quality. For example:

- NTP clock strata
- Synchronization in telecommunications#Components

== See also ==
- Radio clock
- Master clock
- Slave clock
- Time clock
- Time signal
- Time standard
- Clock distribution network
