= Reference clock =

A reference clock may refer to the following:

- A master clock used as a timekeeping standard to regulate or compare the accuracy of other clocks
- In electronics and computing, the clock signal used to synchronise and schedule operations
