= Zamboni pile =

Early electric battery

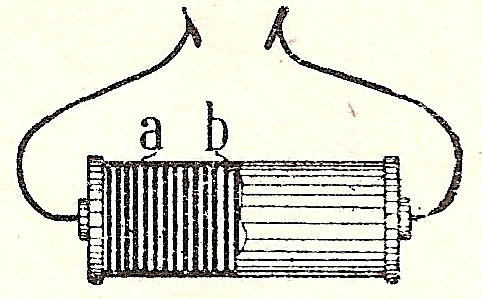
Diagram of a Zamboni pile

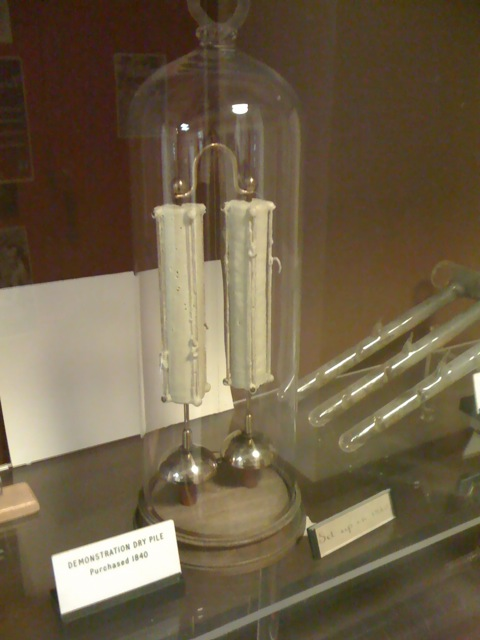
The Oxford Electric Bell, believed to be powered by Zamboni pile batteries

The Zamboni pile (also referred to as a Duluc Dry Pile) is an early electric battery, invented by Giuseppe Zamboni in 1812.

A Zamboni pile is an "electrostatic battery" and is constructed from discs of silver foil, zinc foil, and paper. Alternatively, discs of "silver paper" (paper with a thin layer of zinc on one side) gilded on one side or silver paper smeared with manganese dioxide and honey might be used. Discs of approximately 20 mm diameter are assembled in stacks, which may be several thousand discs thick, and then either compressed in a glass tube with end caps or stacked between three glass rods with wooden end plates and insulated by dipping in molten sulfur or pitch.

Zamboni piles of more modern construction were manufactured as recently as the 1980s for providing the accelerating voltage for image intensifier tubes, particularly in military use. Today such voltages are obtained from flyback converters powered by lithium ion batteries.

The EMF per element is approximately 0.8 V; Zamboni piles can be made to have output potential differences in the kilovolt range, but current output in the nanoampere range. The famous Oxford Electric Bell, which has been ringing continuously since 1840, is thought to be powered by a pair of Zamboni piles.

== See also ==
- Voltaic pile
