= Slave clock =

Clock that is dependent on another clock for its accuracy

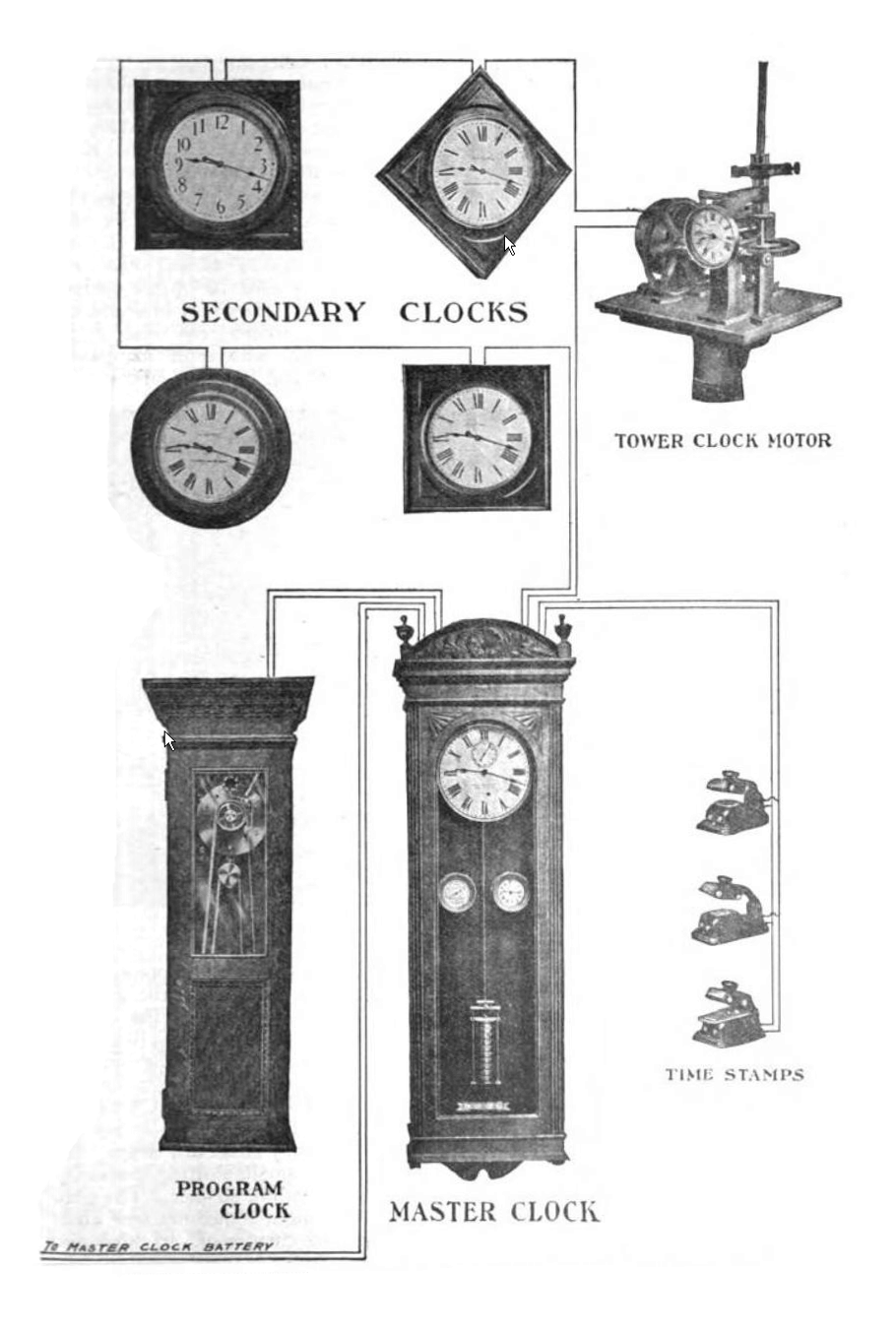
Diagram of electric time system used around 1910 to keep time in factories, schools, and other large institutions. The master clock (bottom center), controlled by a temperature-compensated mercury pendulum, is wired to slave clocks throughout the building. In addition to wall clocks, it also controls time stamps that are used to stamp documents with the time, and a turret clock used in a clock tower. The "program clock" is a timer that can be programmed with punched paper tape to ring bells or turn machines on and off at preprogrammed times.

In telecommunication and horology, a slave clock is a clock that depends on another clock, the master clock. Modern clocks are synchronized through the Internet or by radio time signals, to Coordinated Universal Time. UTC is based on a network of atomic clocks in many countries. For scientific purposes, precision clocks can be synchronized to within nanoseconds by dedicated satellite channels. Slave clock synchronization is usually achieved by phase-locking the slave clock signal to a signal received from the master clock. To adjust for the transit time of the signal from the master clock to the slave clock, the phase of the slave clocks are adjusted so that both clocks are in phase. Thus, the time markers of both clocks, at the output of the clocks, occur simultaneously.

The predecessors of atomic clocks, computer clocks, and digital clocks, these electric clocks (or pneumatic clocks) were synchronized by an electrical pulse, wired to their master clock in the same facility. (In the case of pneumatic clocks, pneumatic tubing was used instead of electrical wiring.) Hence the terms "master" and "slave." From the late 19th to the mid 20th centuries, electrical master/slave clock systems were installed, all clocks in a building or facility synchronized through electric wires to a central master clock. Slave clocks either kept time by themselves, and were periodically corrected by the master clock, or required impulses from the master clock. Many slave clocks of these types were in operation, most commonly in schools, offices, military bases, hospitals, railway networks, telephone exchanges and factories the world over. School bells of elementary schools, high schools, and others were able to be synchronized across an entire campus, connected to the system. In schools, the master clock was in the principal's office, with slave units in classrooms which were in other buildings on campus. In factories, a system with a bell or horn could signal the end of a shift, lunchtime or break time. Very few relics of this electrical, analogue system operate in the 21st century. Most 21st century systems of the type are digital.

== Pictures ==
Mechanical slave clocks from the 1950s and 1960s era.

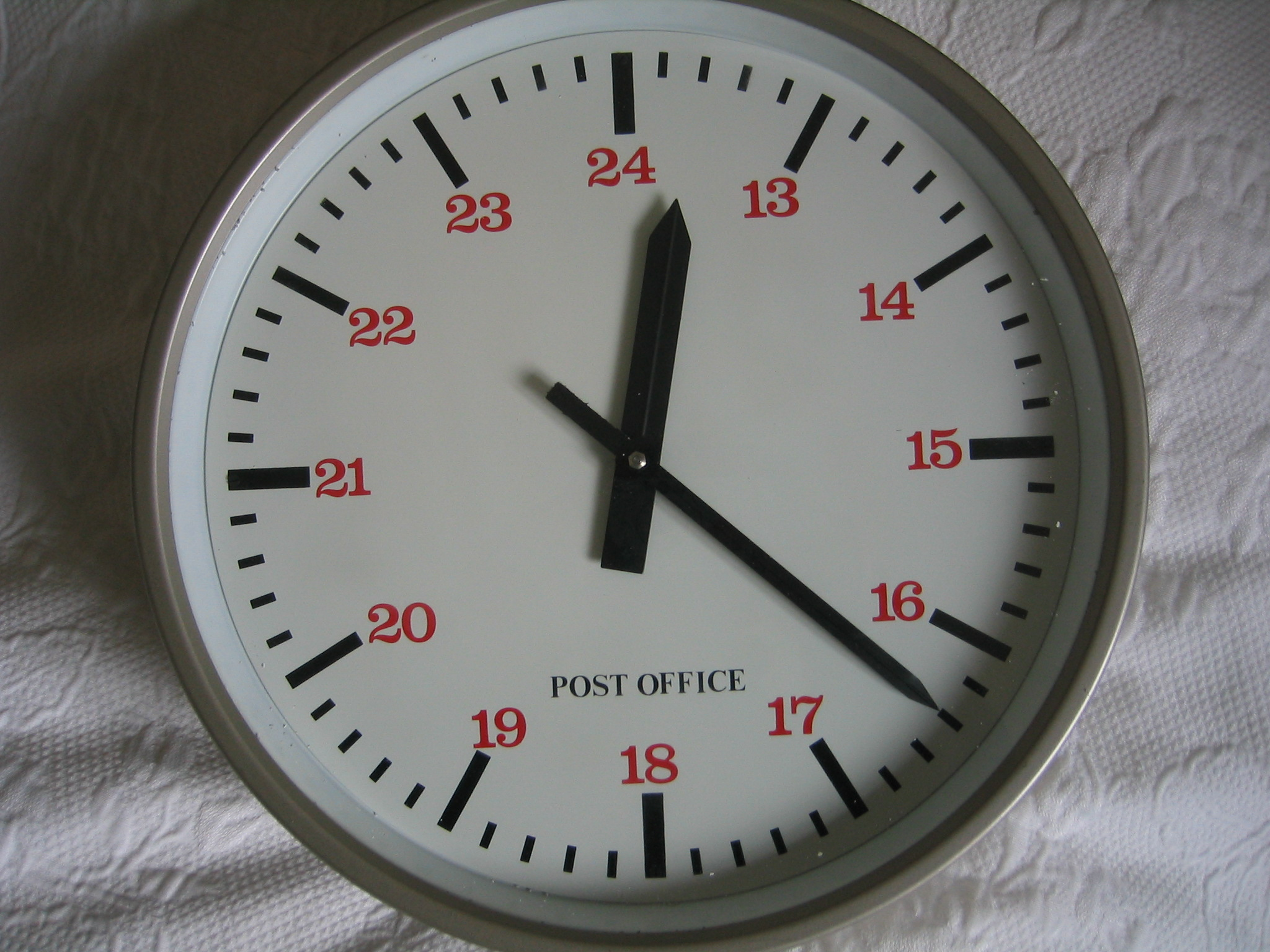
Slave clock

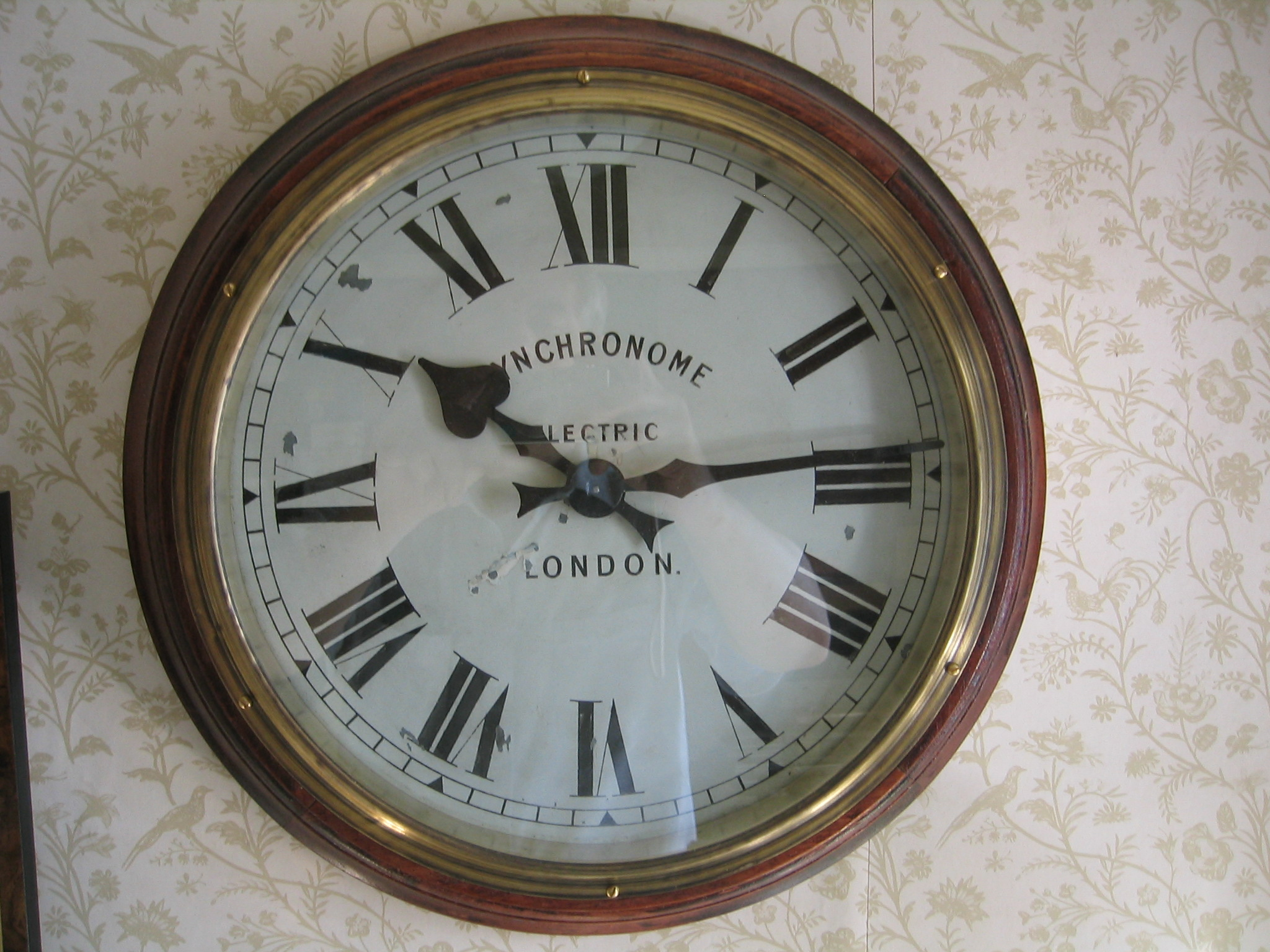
Synchronome slave clock

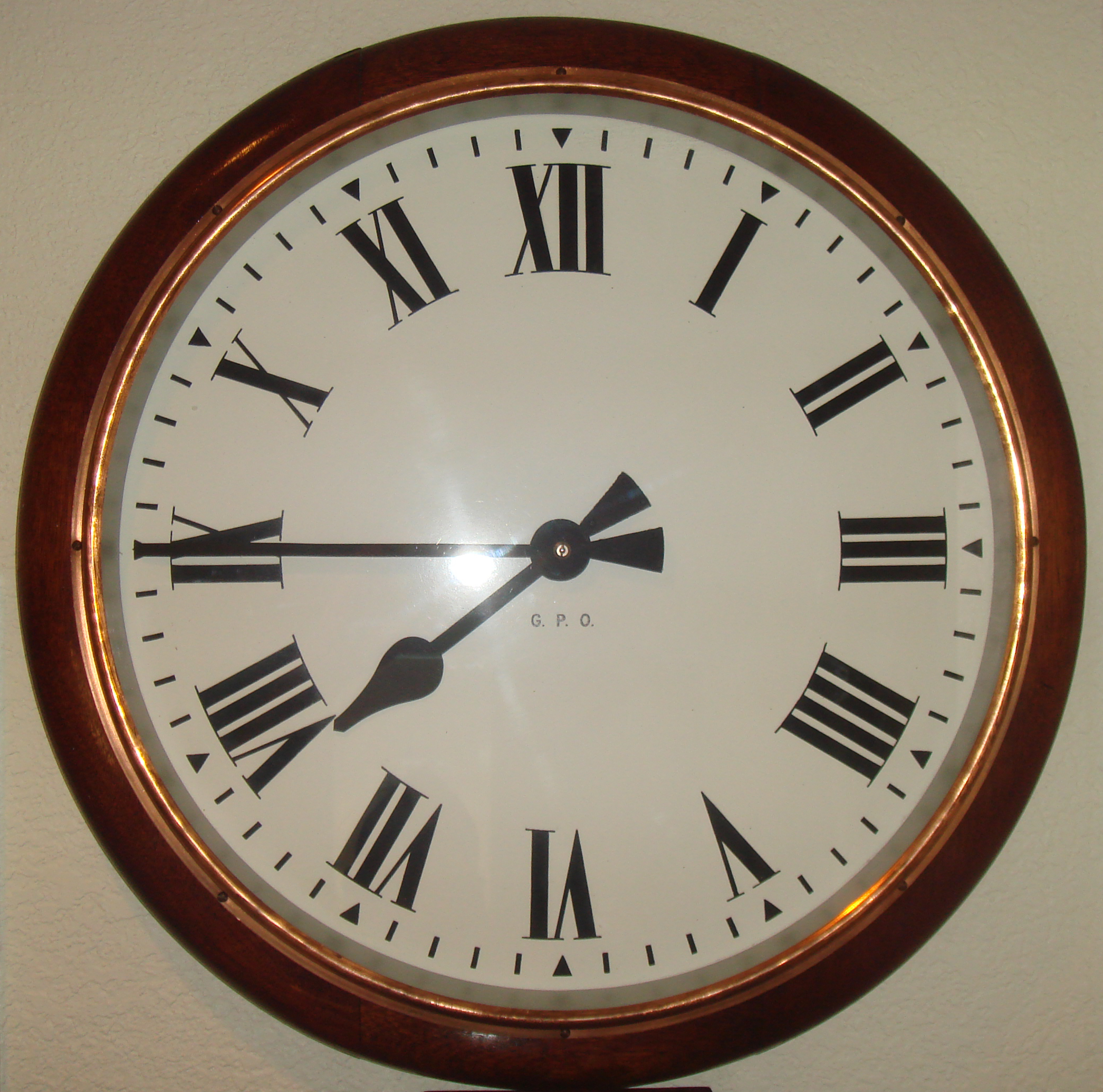
Early G.P.O. type 6, manufactured by Synchronome

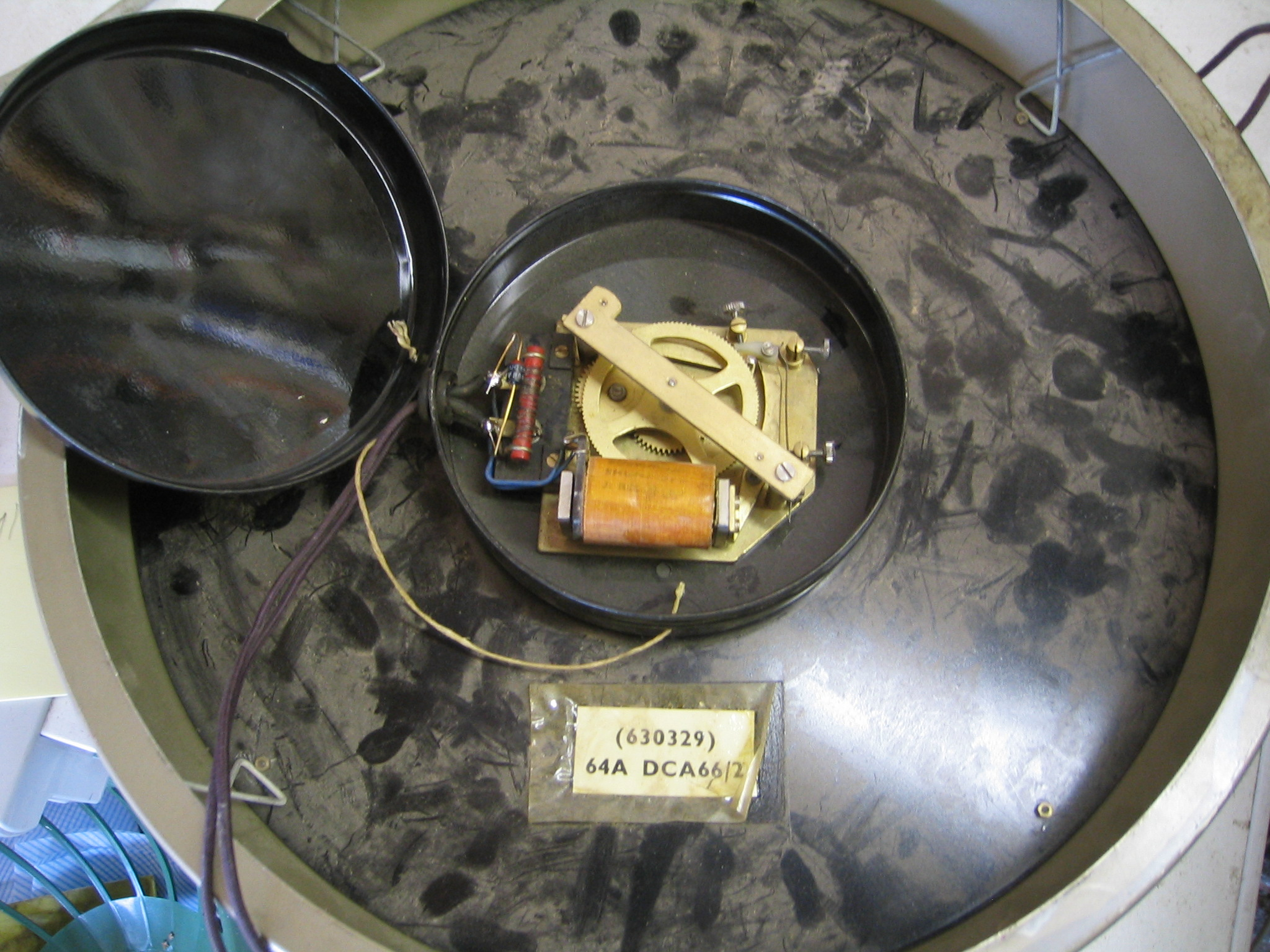
Slave clock drive mechanism

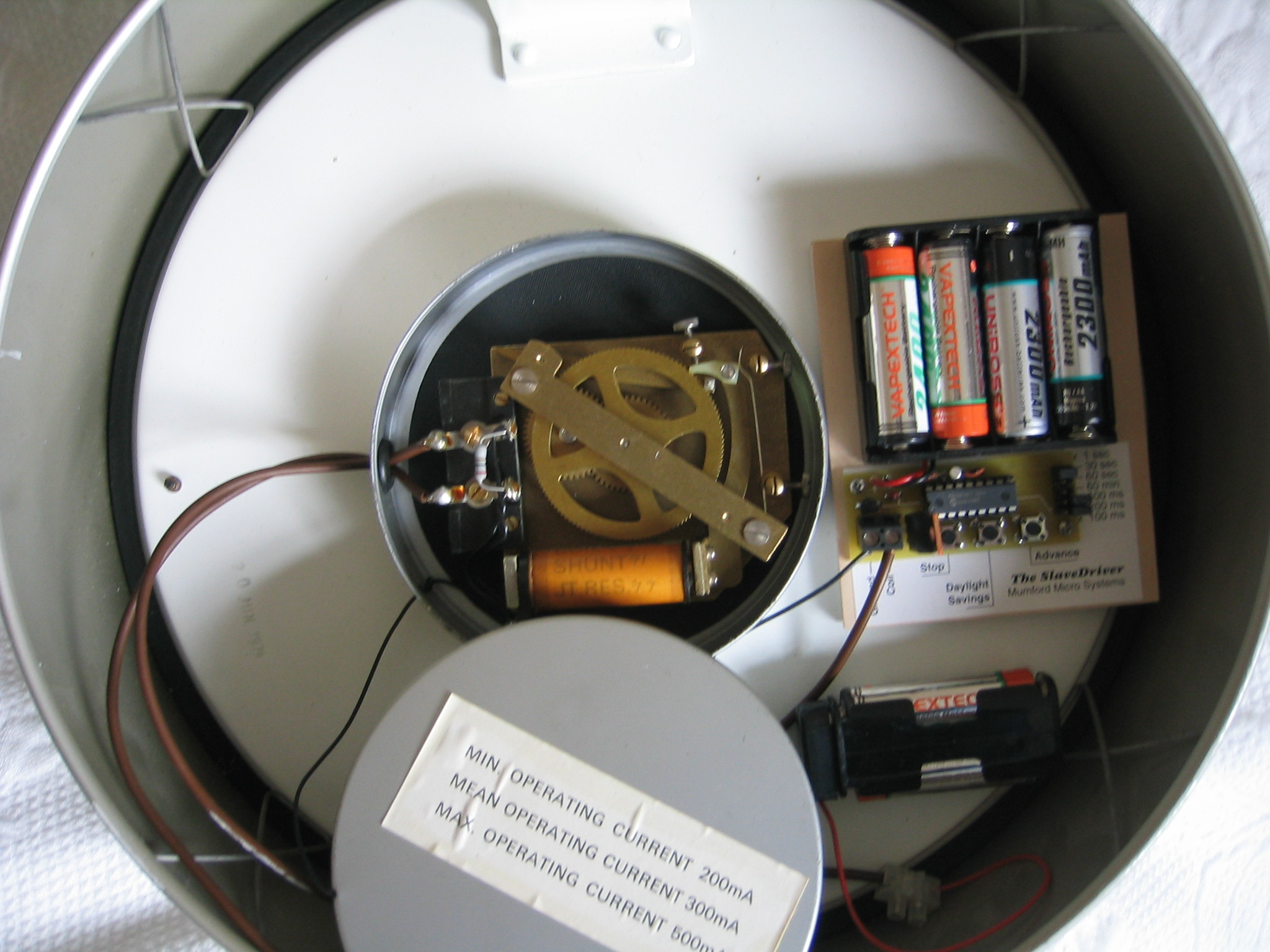
A slave clock driven by a quartz clock module

== See also ==
- Clock network
