= Francesco Bellissimo =

Italian chef

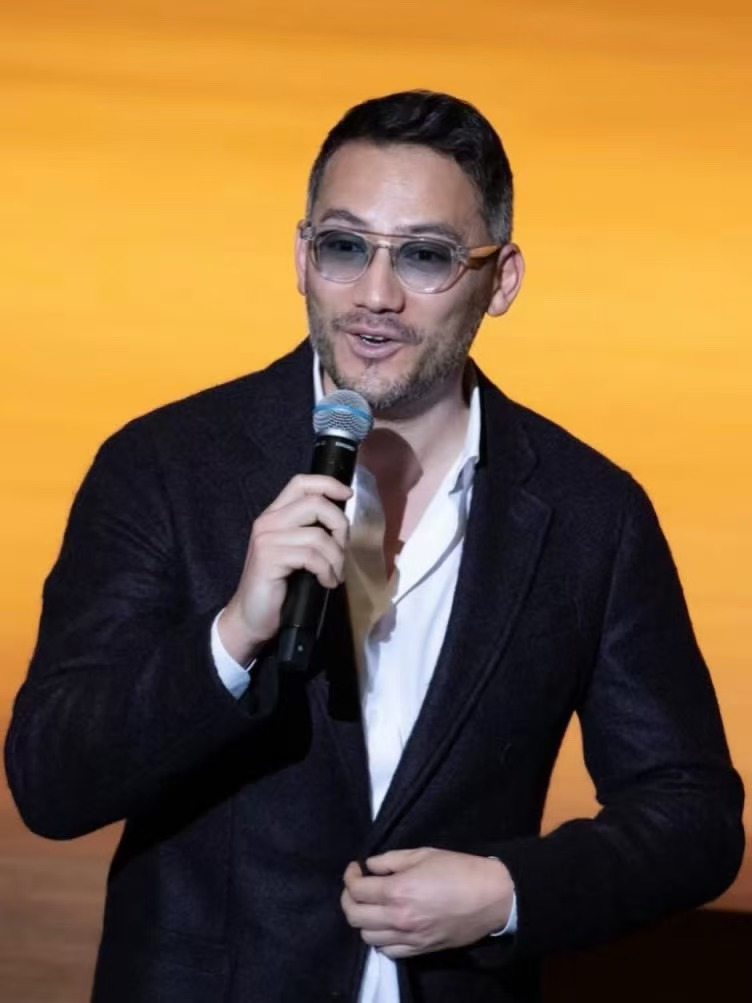
- Born: 3 January 1979 (age 47); Rome, Italy
- Citizenship: Italian
- Occupations: Celebrity chef, actor, tarento, social media personality, martial artist, sommelier dell'Olio
- Years active: 2002–present
- Agent: 株式会社ビリオネア（Billionaire Inc.）
- Known for: Italian cuisine; Japanese television; cultural mediation between Italy and Asia; fashion and lifestyle media

Instagram information
- Page: bellissimoyoshi
- Years active: 2013–present
- Genres: Food, Luxury, Fashion, Life Style
- Followers: 1.6 million

YouTube information
- Channel: ベリッシモtv イタリア人料理研究家の世界
- Years active: 2013–present
- Genres: Recipe, Food, Travel
- Subscribers: 60,000 (12 September 2026)
- Website: Official website

Francesco Bellissimo (Japanese: ベリッシモ・フランチェスコ, Berisshimo Furanchesuko)(Chinese: 贝拂岚 Bèi Fú Lán) (born 3 January 1979 in Rome) is an Italian celebrity chef, actor, foreign tarento, social media personality, fashion influencer, lifestyle influencer, entrepreneur , martial artist and sommelier dell'Olio. He holds the rank of 4th dan black belt in Kyokushin karate. He lives and works in Japan, and nicknamed Italia no Taneuma (イタリアの種馬, Itaria no Taneuma; lit. "Italian Stallion") and Italia Ryori no Kyosho (イタリア料理の巨匠, Itaria Ryori no Kyosho; lit. "Maestro of Italian Cuisine"). He served as the president of the Italian Cooking Association in Japan (“Italian Ryouri Kenkyukai”) for 21 years, from 2005 to 2026. In a survey he was found to be the second most famous Italian in Japan after Giorgio Armani. Bellissimo writes for various Japanese cooking magazines and books.

== Early life ==
Born in Rome on 3 January 1979, Bellissimo took an early interest in cooking through his parents. Graduated from the Alessandro Caravillani Art school of Rome. During his time at Sapienza University of Rome, he entered the army and graduated from school there. In 2001, he came to Japan and graduated from a Japanese language class at the YMCA. He has won first place at a Japanese debate contest.

== Career ==
Since the 2010s, Bellissimo has become one of the most visible Italian personalities on Japanese television, particularly through programs such as "Sekai no minna ni kiitemita" and "Sekai banzuke" His positive image is frequently associated with various products, both Italian and Japanese, through live events in Japan, Italy, and abroad. Bellissimo is often sought after as a presenter, guest, and moderator at major conferences and cultural events, particularly those centered on food, lifestyle, and entertainment. Additionally, he has appeared in commercials and on news programs. Besides his work as a chef and a foreign tarento, Bellissimo has experience as a food critic, Italian cuisine consultant, motivational speaker, model for fashion magazines, columnist, essayist, and sports commentator. His expertise in Italian culture extends to fashion, where he has been recognized for his trendsetting approach.

== Research on historical Italian cuisine ==
In 2017, he launched a cultural and historical program on Italian Renaissance cuisine in collaboration with historian Daniele Macuglia from Peking University. The project began with an investigation of courtly food and examined how Renaissance authors described the table as a setting where art and learning shaped everyday life. Among the sources considered are the notebooks of Leonardo da Vinci, which include reflections linking proportion and sensory observation to the material culture of the kitchen. From this nucleus the research turned to Ancient Rome, examined as a classical framework through which early modern Italy redefined ideas of taste and civility. The results have been presented in academic and public venues in the United States, China, the European Union, and Japan. Within this framework, Bellissimo and Macuglia regard cuisine as part of a wider inquiry into how culture records experience through material forms.

== Cultural mediation between Italy and East Asia ==
For more than twenty years, Francesco Bellissimo has worked to promote Italian cuisine and culture in Asia through media activity, educational programs, and public initiatives. His work connects gastronomy with cultural diplomacy and has contributed to the representation of Italy in contemporary Asian contexts. He has participated in projects that present Japanese craftsmanship and regional food traditions to audiences in Europe and other regions. Within this long exchange, Bellissimo is noted for his role in cultural mediation between Italy and East Asia. His activity shows how cuisine can function as a medium for international understanding and as an element of modern soft power.。

== Social engagement and SDG initiatives ==
Bellissimo takes part in initiatives consistent with the United Nations Sustainable Development Goals (SDGs). His activity highlights sustainability as a practical ethic and promotes food education as a means of civic growth. He has joined environmental programs that encourage careful use of resources and has worked with organizations that provide meals and support to children and elderly people. In cooperation with charities and public bodies, he advances projects that connect culinary knowledge with community life and regard food as a field of shared responsibility.

== Filmography ==
=== Appearances in Television Variety Programs ===
- Handsome Kitchen (Fuji Television)
- Waratte Iitomo! (Fuji Television)
- Wagamama!Kimama!Tabikibun (BS-Fuji)
- GakkoChakkoTV (Akita Television)
- Konnichiwa Itto6ken (NHK)
- Kitchen ga hashiru! (NHK)
- One Seg Lunch Box Raku Gohan (NHK)
- Junbanmachi no Ryorikyoshitsu (LaLa TV)
- Sekai ga Odorita Nippon!Sugoi desune!!Shisatsudan (TV Asahi)
- Uchigohan (TV Asahi)
- Eko no Saho (TV Asahi)
- Shikamo!! (Nippon Television)
- Sekai banzuke (Nippon Television)
- Osama no brunch (Tokyo Broadcasting System)
- Sekai fushigi hakken! (Tokyo Broadcasting System)
- Sekai no minna ni kiitemita (Tokyo Broadcasting System)
- Sekai kurabetemitara (Tokyo Broadcasting System)
- Bara iro Dandi (Tokyo MX)
- Goji ni Muchu(Tokyo MX)
- Abema Prime (Abema)

=== Radio ===
- J-Wave – GOLD RUSH
- J-Wave – WORLD AIR CURRENT
- NHK Radio 1 – Chikyū Radio
- NHK Radio 1 – Rajiru Lab
- Bunka Hōsō – Otonari-san
- Nippon Broadcasting System – Kenji Minemura & Hideo Matsumoto’s Gentle! Gentle?

=== Appearances in Television Dramas ===
- I'm Taking the Day Off (2014), Italian Chef
- You Can't Expense This! (2019), Italian Chef
- Adventure of Comandante Cappellini (2022), Simone

=== Films ===
- Taverna de Gaga (2025), Salvatore

=== Appearances in Live Sports Broadcasting ===
- Blaublitz Akita matches (Akita Television)

=== Appearances in Commercials ===
- Suits for AEON's Top Value line (March–May 2014)
- Italian suits for AEON's Top Value line (September–November 2014)
- Setagaya Shizensyokuhin (December 2018 – )
- Croquette no Manma for Mikakuto Co., Ltd (October 2019 – December 2019)

== Bibliography ==
- Bellissimo, Francesco (2010). Ouchi de Itaria Gohan Berisshimo to oryōri dēto. Tokyo: Bunkasha. ISBN 978-4821142941.
- Bellissimo, Francesco (2010). Sono Manma Obun Ryori. Tokyo: Shufunotomosha. ISBN 978-4072691335.
- Bellissimo, Francesco (2012). Italian no Kihon to Oisha no Kotsu. Tokyo: Nittōshoinhonsha. ISBN 978-4528015050.
- Bellissimo, Francesco (2013). Yidali shuai ge zhu chu dao ni jia : gan lan you jian kang liao li, 5 fen zhong YAMI shang cai. Taipei: Taibei Shi. ISBN 978-9863430032.
- Bellissimo, Francesco (2014). Bijinesu pason no sasou gijutsu : Tecniche di comunicazione e relazione interpersonale per uomini d'affari. Tokyo: Diamond-sha. ISBN 978-4478026311.
- Bellissimo, Francesco (2014). Berisshimo na Omotemeshi Itariashiki koi no shokujiho : Tecniche di cucina italiana per avere successo in amore. Tokyo: Shufutoseikatsusha. ISBN 978-4391146066.
- Bellissimo, Francesco (2015). Jing dian yi da li mei shi 100 dao. Taipei: Taibei shi. OCLC 909245594.

== Magazine appearances ==
- Forbes Japan (link-ties)
- Shukan Shincho (Shinchosha)
- Cosmopolitan (Hearst Communications)
- Shuukan Shinchou (Shinchosha)
- "Nutrition and Cooking" (Kagawa Nutrition University)
- AMARENA (Fusosha Publishing)
- ESSE (Fusosha Publishing)
- SPA! (Fusosha Publishing)
- "ASCII Weekly" (ASCII Media Works)
- CanCam (Shogakukan)
- PRECIOUS (Shogakukan)
- Jyosei Seven (Shogakukan)
- BIteki (Shogakukan)
- S Cawaii! (SHUFUNOTOMO)
- Akachan Ga Hoshii (SHUFUNOTOMO)

Among others

== Awards and nominations ==
=== Sky PerfecTV! Awards ===
Year	Nominated work	Category	Result	Ref.
2012	Handsome Kitchen	Best Cooking TV Show	Won	
