= Contact tension =

Force to transfer electrons between metals

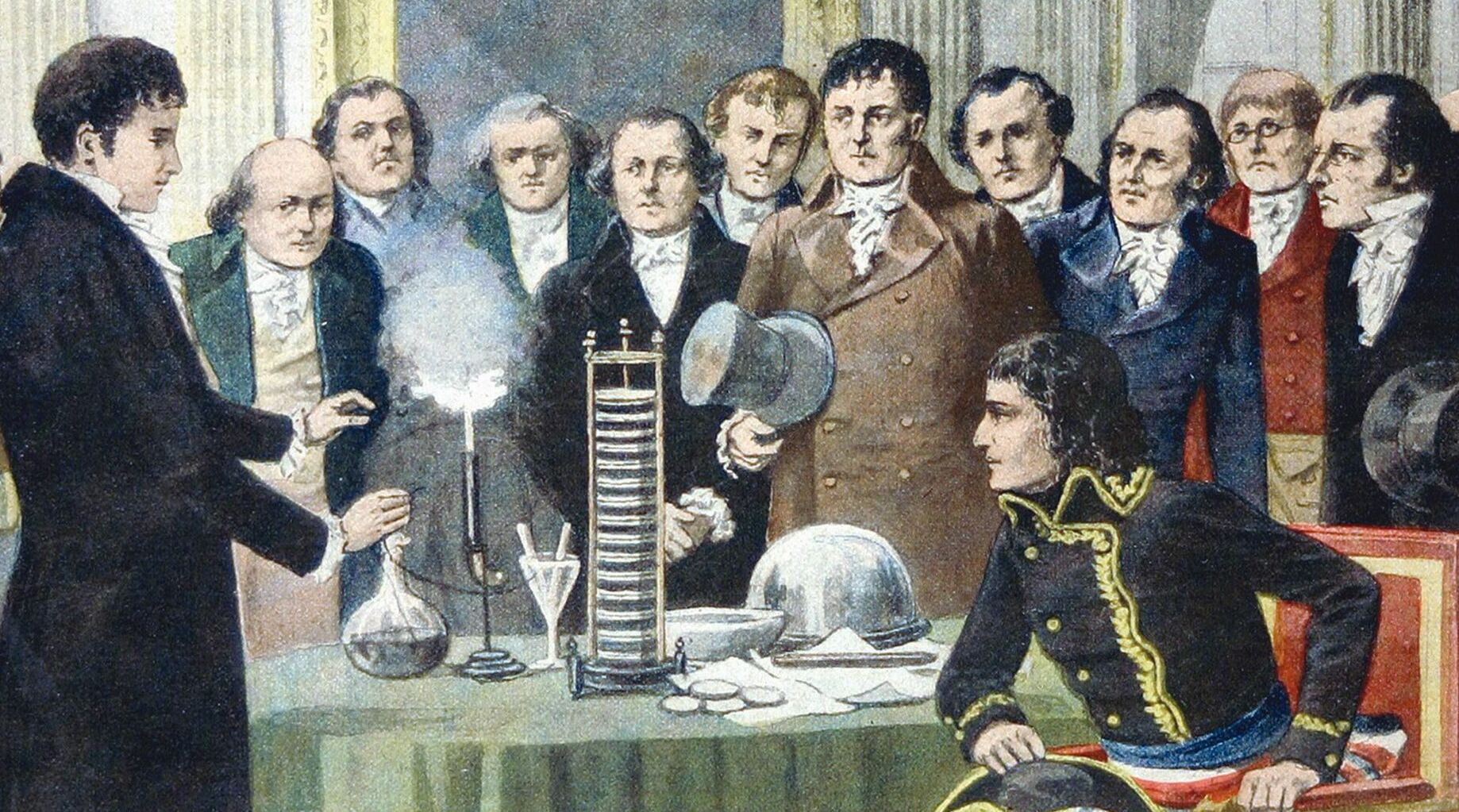
Alessandro Volta demonstrates his battery to Napoleon.

Contact tension (also known as the contact electromotive force) is a force suggested by Alessandro Volta in 1800 to explain how electricity is generated in an electric battery or, as it was then called, the Voltaic pile. The validity of this model versus one based upon chemical reactions was debated for much of the 19th century in what has been called the Galvani-Volta controversy. While it was not the appropriate explanation for batteries, this model (which is now called the contact or Volta potential) is valid science. It plays an important role in contact electrification as well as in many areas of semiconductor physics such as p–n junctions. This only became apparent much later after a more complete understanding of phenomena such as work functions evolved based upon quantum mechanics.

== History ==
For many years after the discovery of batteries there was debate about the source of their electrical current. In 1800 Volta proposed that electricity could be produced just by the contact of two dissimilar metals, what is now called contact electrification. This concept was not completely original, for instance it can be found mentioned in the 1789 work of Abraham Bennett. In his original paper Volta suggested that this was how electricity was produced in a battery (Voltaic pile). The alternative explanation that originated with Giovanni Fabbroni was that it was connected more to electrochemical reactions. This debate lasted for much of the 19th century, even partially into the 20th. A number of high voltage dry piles were invented between the early 1800s and the 1830s in an attempt to determine the answer to this question, and specifically to support Volta's hypothesis of contact tension. One of these was the first electric clock invented by Francis Ronalds in 1814. The Oxford Electric Bell is another example.

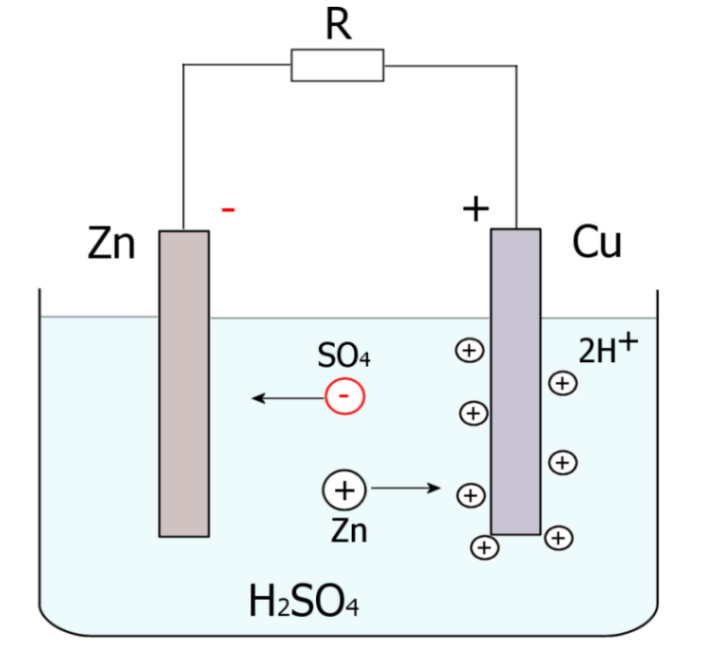
Simplified diagram of a voltaic cell The positive (+) cathode is on the right, the negative (-) anode on the left. Inside the battery the zinc is oxidised and hydrogen ions (H+) are reduced.

The explanation of how a battery works was eventually decided in favor of the current theory of electrochemistry, namely, that electricity in a battery is generated by the action of chemical reactions and the exchange of electrons between atoms making up the battery. For instance, for the battery shown here the zinc atoms are oxidised to (Zn2+) ions, which travel from the anode to the cathode. At the cathode they reduce hydrogen ions (H+) leading to the evolution of hydrogen gas. An important fact that contributed to the rejection of the theory of contact tension was the observation that corrosion, that is, the chemical degradation of the battery, seemed unavoidable with its use, and that the more electricity was drawn from the battery, the faster the corrosion proceeded.

While the Volta effect was no longer part of the explanation of batteries, the concept did not vanish. It remained an important component of research on triboelectricity in the early 20th century, for instance the work in 1915 of Fernando Sanford and others. With the advent of an understanding of modern band structure in metals Volta's concept had a solid fundamental justification based upon a more complete description at the quantum mechanical level of work functions as first analyzed by John Bardeen and later by Norton D Lang and Walter Kohn.

When the two metals depicted here are in thermodynamic equilibrium with each other as shown (equal Fermi levels), the vacuum electrostatic potential φ is not flat due to a difference in work function.

The Volta effect corresponds to an electric potential developed by the contact of different materials, called, depending upon context, the Volta potential or Galvani potential. Volta described the contact between two metals as the source of an "electromotive force" that would drive electrons from one metal to the other. In modern terminology, the two different metals have different work functions leading to a voltage difference. This voltage difference does provide a force to transfer electrons from one metal to the other as Volta proposed, a process called contact electrification. However, the transfer of electrons raises the energy of the electrons on one side, drops them on the other. The equilibrium energy of the electrons, called the Fermi energy, is then equal so no further current will flow.

While the term was first used for two dissimilar metals, with any two dissimilar materials there is always a potential difference. Indeed, there can even be a voltage between different faces of the same material such as observed for copper, as well as the same material but with different dopant elements. The later is central to the behavior of many semiconductor devices such as p-n junctions.

As an explanation of how a battery works Volta's "contact tension" was incorrect; as a simplified description of a common and important physical process his work remains relevant.

== See also ==
- History of the battery
- History of Electrochemistry
