= Daniele Macuglia =

Italian physicist and historian of science

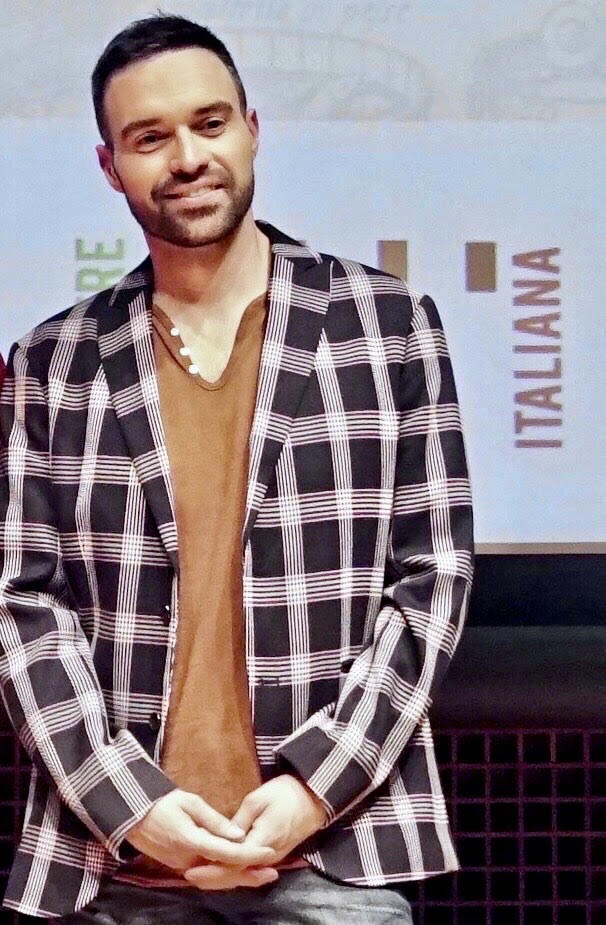
- Macuglia at the Istituto Italiano di Cultura in Tokyo in 2019
- Born: 22 February 1984 (age 42); Tolmezzo, Udine, Italy
- Other name: 马大年
- Known for: History of computational physics; epistemology of molecular dynamics

Academic background
- Education: University of Pavia; University of Chicago
- Website: www.danielemacuglia.com

Daniele Macuglia (born 22 February 1984) is an Italian physicist and historian of science whose research bridges computational statistical mechanics and the epistemology of modern physics. He is an assistant professor at Peking University. Before moving to Beijing, he was a research fellow at the Neubauer Collegium for Culture and Society at the University of Chicago.

== Biography ==
Born in Tolmezzo, Italy, Macuglia studied physics at the University of Pavia, where he graduated summa cum laude while enrolled at the Institute for Advanced Studies of Pavia (IUSS). He later moved to the University of Chicago, where he earned a PhD in the history and philosophy of science under the joint supervision of Wolf Prize laureate Leo P. Kadanoff and Sarton Medalist Robert J. Richards.

His research investigates the epistemological foundations of computational statistical mechanics, specifically analyzing how Monte Carlo methods and molecular dynamics have historically redefined evidentiary standards in condensed-matter physics. His historical studies of computational biophysics include collaborations with Nobel laureate Martin Karplus. He has also co-authored research on contemporary methodological developments with scientists including Giovanni Ciccotti and Benoît Roux.

Parallel to his research in physics, Macuglia investigates the intellectual history of early modern Europe through the lens of material and culinary culture. In collaboration with chef and author Francesco Bellissimo, he examines how period texts and gastronomic traditions reflect broader patterns of cultural and scientific knowledge exchange. This research draws on archival materials and is presented through cultural programs supported by Italian embassies and consular institutes, in collaboration with universities in Asia, Europe, and North America.

== Awards ==
Macuglia received First Prize at the Italian national contest "I Giovani e le Scienze" and a Special Prize at the European Union Contest for Young Scientists. In 2020, he was awarded the prize for best communication in the history of science by the Italian Physical Society. At Peking University, he received the "Excellence Award" (Chinese: 优秀奖) for University Teaching in 2023 and the "Xuri Award" (Chinese: 旭日奖, lit. "Rising Sun") in 2024, a faculty distinction for contributions to education.
