= Master clock =

Precision clock that synchronizes other clocks in a network

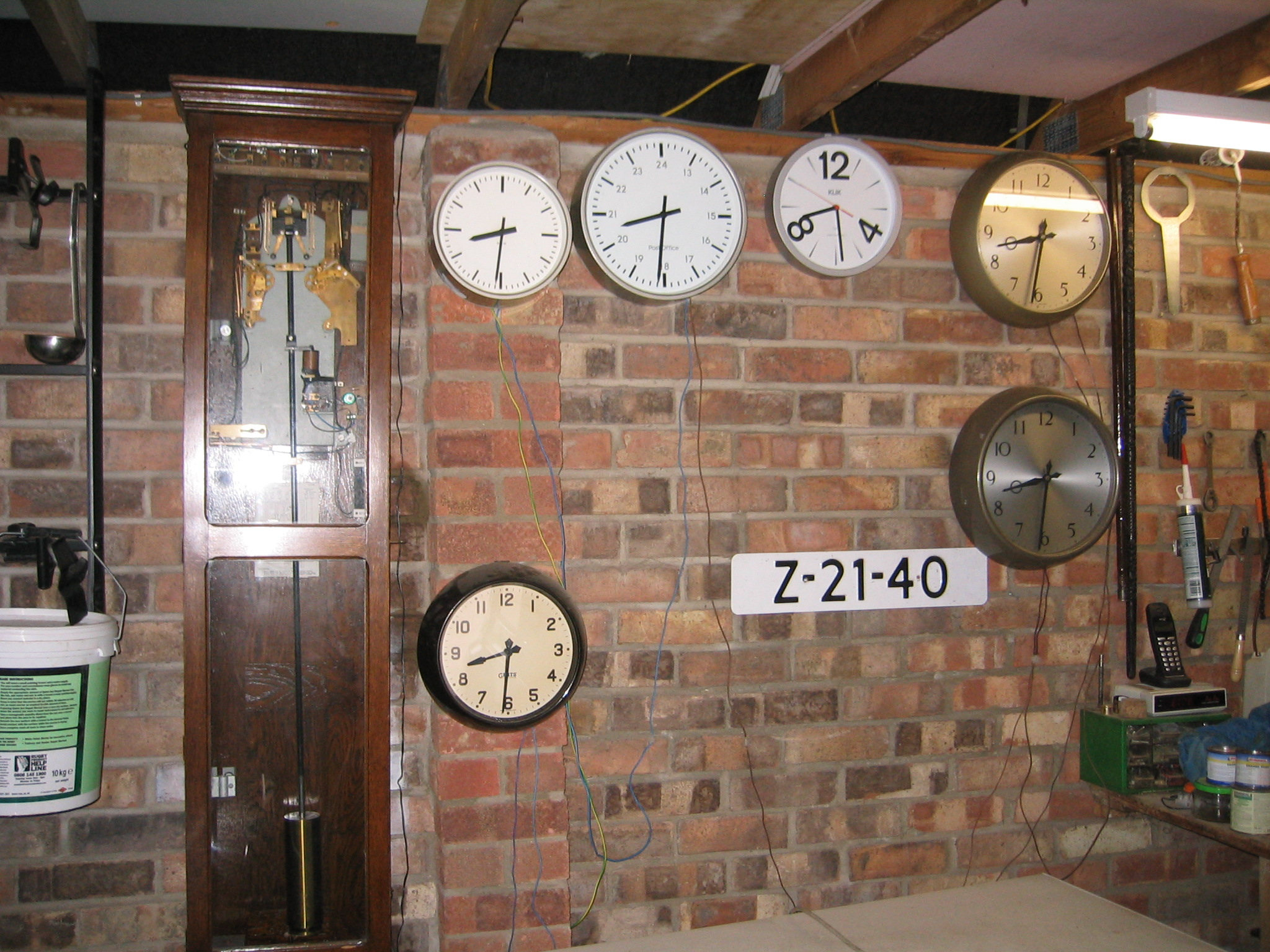
Master clock (at left) driving several slave clocks in an enthusiast's garage. The third one from the left at the top is a radio-controlled clock for reference.

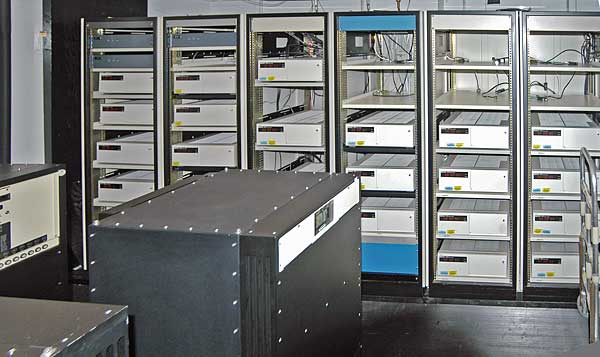
The master atomic clock ensemble at the U.S. Naval Observatory in Washington, D.C., which provides the time standard for the U.S. Department of Defense. The rack-mounted units in the background are HP 5071A caesium beam clocks. The black units in the foreground are Sigma-Tau MHM-2010 hydrogen maser standards.

A master clock is a precision clock that provides timing signals to synchronise slave clocks as part of a clock network. Networks of electric clocks connected by wires to a precision master pendulum clock began to be used in institutions like factories, offices, and schools around 1900. Modern radio clocks are synchronised by radio signals or Internet connections to a worldwide time system called Coordinated Universal Time (UTC), which is governed by primary reference atomic clocks in many countries.

A modern, atomic version of a master clock is the large clock ensemble found at the U.S. Naval Observatory.

== History ==
Between the late 1800s and the availability of Internet time services, many large institutions that depended on accurate timekeeping such as schools, offices, railway networks, telephone exchanges, and factories used master/slave clock networks. These consisted of multiple slave clocks and other timing devices, connected through wires to a master clock which kept them synchronized by electrical signals. The master clock was usually a precision pendulum clock with a seconds pendulum and a robust mechanism. It generated periodic timing signals by electrical contacts attached to the mechanism, transmitted to the controlled equipment through pairs of wires. The controlled devices could be wall clocks, tower clocks, factory sirens, school bells, time card punches, and paper tape programmers that ran factory machines. Thousands of such systems were installed in industrial countries and enabled the precise scheduling that industrial economies depended on.

In early networks, the slave clocks had their own timekeeping mechanism and were just corrected by the signals from the master clock every hour, 6, 12, or 24 hours. In later networks, the slave clocks were simply counters that used a stepper motor to advance the hands with each pulse from the master clock, once per second or once per minute. Some types, such as the Synchronome, had optional extra mechanisms to compare the time of the clock with a national time service that distributed time signals from astronomical regulator clocks in a country's naval observatory by telegraph wire. An example is the GPO time service in Britain which distributed signals from the Greenwich Observatory.

The British Post Office (GPO) used such master clocks in their electromechanical telephone exchanges to generate the call timing pulses necessary to charge telephone subscribers for their calls, and to control sequences of events such as the forcible clearing of connections where the calling subscriber failed to hang up after the called subscriber had done so. The UK had four such manufacturers, all of whom made clocks to the same GPO specification and which used the Hipp Toggle impulse system; these were Gent and Co., of Leicester, Magneta Ltd of Leatherhead in Surrey, Synchronome Ltd of Alperton, north-west London, and Gillett and Johnson.

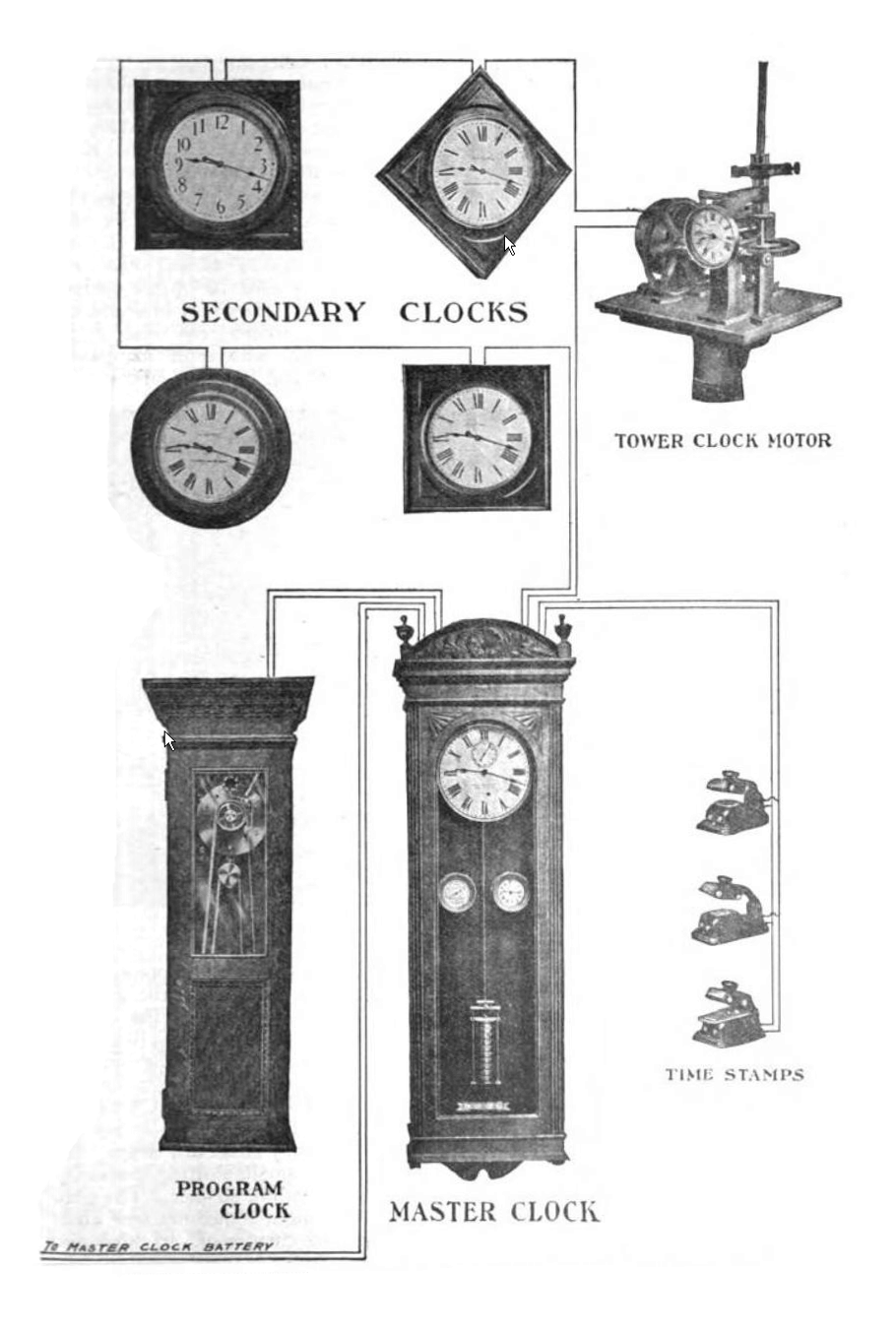
Diagram of electric time system used around 1910 to keep time in factories, schools, and other large institutions. The master clock (bottom centre), controlled by a temperature-compensated mercury pendulum, is wired to slave clocks throughout the building. In addition to wall clocks, it also controls time stamps that are used to stamp documents with the time and a turret clock used in a clock tower. The program clock is a timer that can be programmed with punched paper tape to ring bells or turn machines on and off at preprogrammed times.

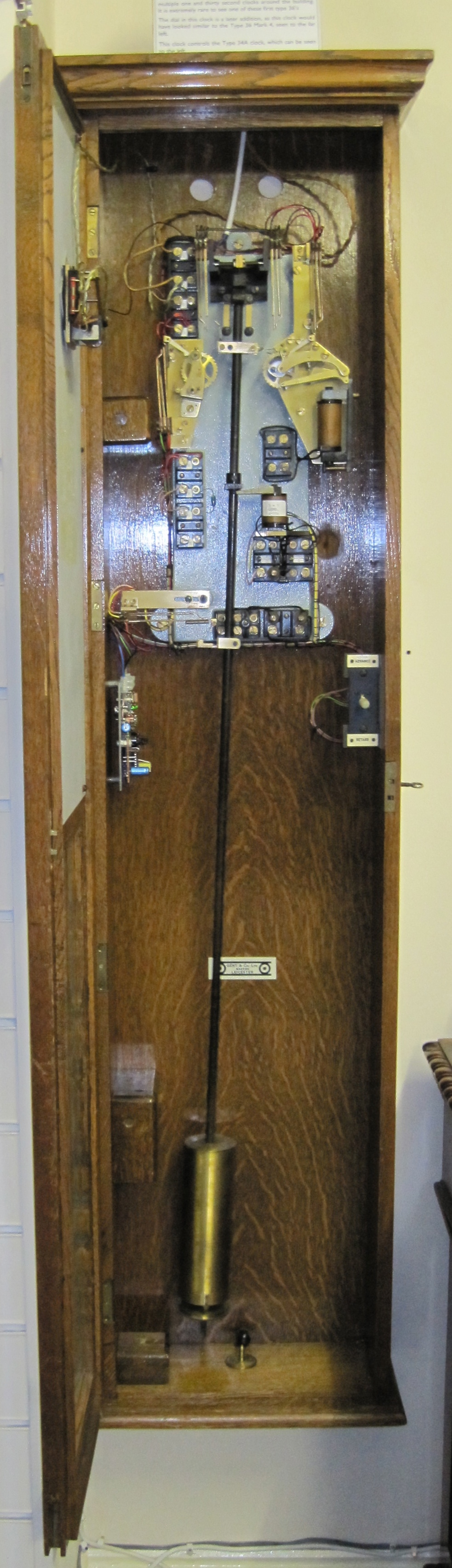
GPO Master clock type 36 Mark 3, by Gent and Co., UK. This clock was made with a synchronising mechanism, responsive to an external signal relayed by land line from the GPO Chronopher at St.Martin's le grand, which in turn, received it from the Greenwich Observatory.

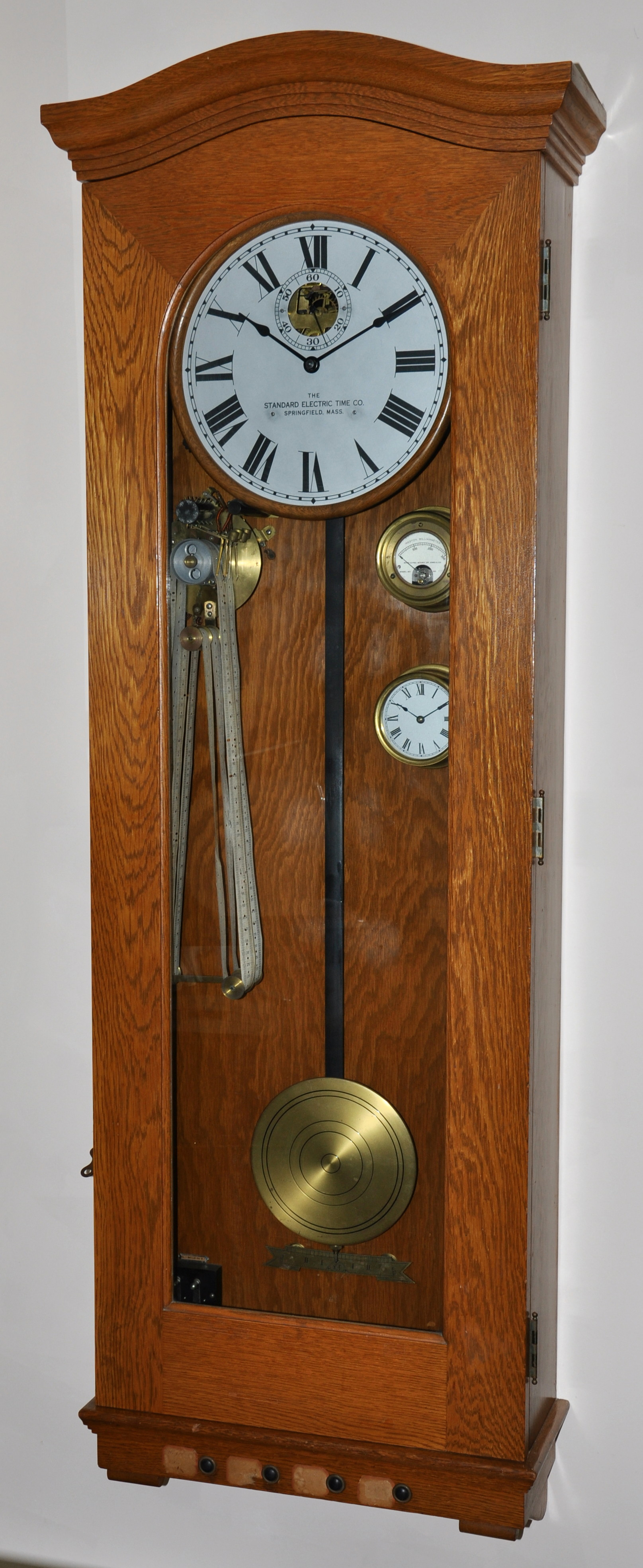
Master clock from synchronised school clock system, c. 1928. Electromechanical movement winds each minute, and impulses slave clocks each minute. Operates on 24-volt DC.

== See also ==
- Clock synchronization
- Escapement
- Pendulum clock
- Shortt–Synchronome clock
