= Oxford Electric Bell =

Experimental electric bell

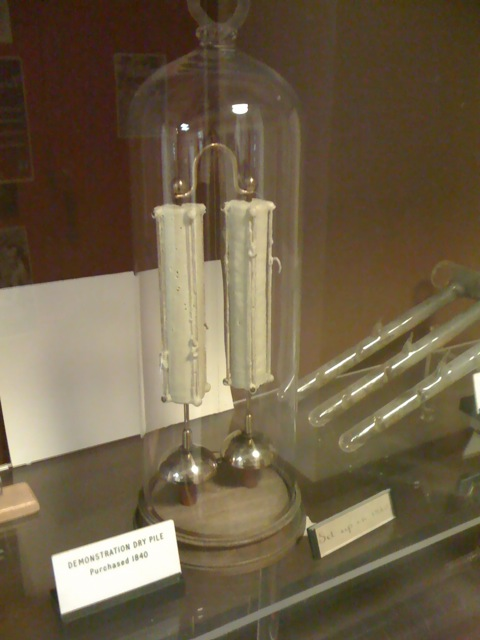
The Oxford Electric Bell in December 2009

Charged by the two piles, the clapper moves back and forth between the two bells. The distance between the bells is significantly exaggerated.

The Oxford Electric Bell or Clarendon Dry Pile is an experimental electric bell, in particular a type of bell that uses the electrostatic clock principle, that was set up in 1840 and which has run nearly continuously ever since. It was one of the first pieces purchased for a collection of apparatus by clergyman and physicist Robert Walker. It is located in a corridor adjacent to the foyer of the Clarendon Laboratory at the University of Oxford, England, and is still ringing every half second, albeit inaudibly due to being behind two layers of glass.

== Design ==
The experiment consists of two brass bells, each positioned beneath a dry pile (a form of battery), the pair of piles connected in series, giving the bells opposite electric charges. The clapper is a metal sphere approximately 4 mm (3/16 in) in diameter suspended between the piles, which rings the bells alternately due to electrostatic forces. When the clapper touches one bell, it is charged by that pile. It is then repelled from that bell due to having the same charge and attracted to the other bell, which has the opposite charge. The clapper then touches the other bell and the process reverses, leading to oscillation. The use of electrostatic forces means that while high voltage is required to create motion, only a tiny amount of charge is carried from one bell to the other. As a result, the batteries drain very slowly, which is why the piles have been able to last since the apparatus was set up in 1840. Its oscillation frequency is 2 hertz, or every half second.

The exact composition of the dry piles is unknown, but it is known that they have been coated with molten sulfur for insulation and it is thought that they may be Zamboni piles.

At one point this sort of device played an important role in distinguishing between two different theories of electrical action: the theory of contact tension and the theory of chemical action.

The Oxford Electric Bell does not demonstrate perpetual motion. The bell will eventually stop when the dry piles have distributed their charges equally if the clapper does not wear out first. The Bell has produced approximately 10 billion rings since 1840 and holds the Guinness World Record as "the world's most durable battery [delivering] ceaseless tintinnabulation".

== Operation ==
Apart from occasional short interruptions caused by high humidity, the bell has rung continuously since 1840. The bell may have been constructed in 1825.

== See also ==
- Long-term experiment
- Franklin bells
- Beverly Clock (1864)
- Pitch drop experiment (1927)
- Clock of the Long Now
