= Paris compressed air network =

Urban compressed-air power network, 1879–1994

The Paris compressed air network, run by Compagnie Parisienne de l'Air Comprimé (CPAC), later renamed Société Urbaine de Distribution d'Air Comprimé (SUDAC), was an innovative infrastructure project that supplied compressed air across Paris. From 1879 until 1994, this network competed with electricity as a source of motive power for Parisian commercial and industrial applications.

== Background ==
Before the establishment of the compressed air power network, Paris was already familiar with pneumatic systems by virtue of its pneumatic postal service. The Paris pneumatic post, which began operating in 1866, utilized a network of pneumatic tubes. Traveling through tubes laid within sewers and subway lines, these tubes bypassed congested streets to rapidly transmit messages within the city. This system was to be the precursor for applications of pneumatic technology in Paris.

== History of the Compressed Air Power Network ==
=== Early Development ===
The concept of using compressed air for powering machinery was introduced to Paris by Austrian engineer Viktor Popp in 1867, initially for the purpose of synchronizing public clocks. In 1879, Popp founded the Compagnie des Horloges Pneumatiques, which in 1889 evolved into the Compagnie Parisienne de l'Air Comprimé (CPAC). CPAC supplied pneumatic power to various establishments, including clock towers, elevators, and industrial facilities.

=== Expansion and Peak ===
During the late 19th century, the power network expanded significantly. For nearly a century from its initial operation, the compressed air network saw largely slow but steady growth. The network reached a thousand subscribers for the first time sometime between 1897 and 1898. In 1949, CPAC was renamed Sudac air service (SUDAC). The system continued to expand throughout the early 20th century, serving nearly 10,000 clients by 1960. The network distributed compressed air at a pressure of 5–6 bar over more than 900 km of mains.

=== Decline and Transformation ===
By 1927, the compressed air power network was no longer being used to synchronize private or public clocks. As local industry declined in the latter half of the 20th century, demand for the compressed-air network decreased. By the 1970s, SUDAC began shifting its focus towards on‑site production of compressed air for clients, installing its first such unit in 1973. The network's operations continued until 1994, when the City of Paris terminated the concession for compressed‑air distribution.

=== Legacy ===
The Paris compressed air power network was a remarkable example of urban infrastructure innovation, demonstrating the potential of pneumatic power in a city‑wide context. Although it eventually gave way to more efficient technologies like electricity, its legacy remains as a testament to the ingenuity of late 19th and early 20th‑century engineers.

== See also ==
- History of Compressed-Air Energy Storage
