= Voltaic pile =

Early electric battery

Schematic diagram of a copper–zinc voltaic pile. Each copper–zinc pair had a spacer in the middle, made of cardboard or felt soaked in salt water (the electrolyte). Volta's original piles contained an additional zinc disk at the bottom, and an additional copper disk at the top; these were later shown to be unnecessary.

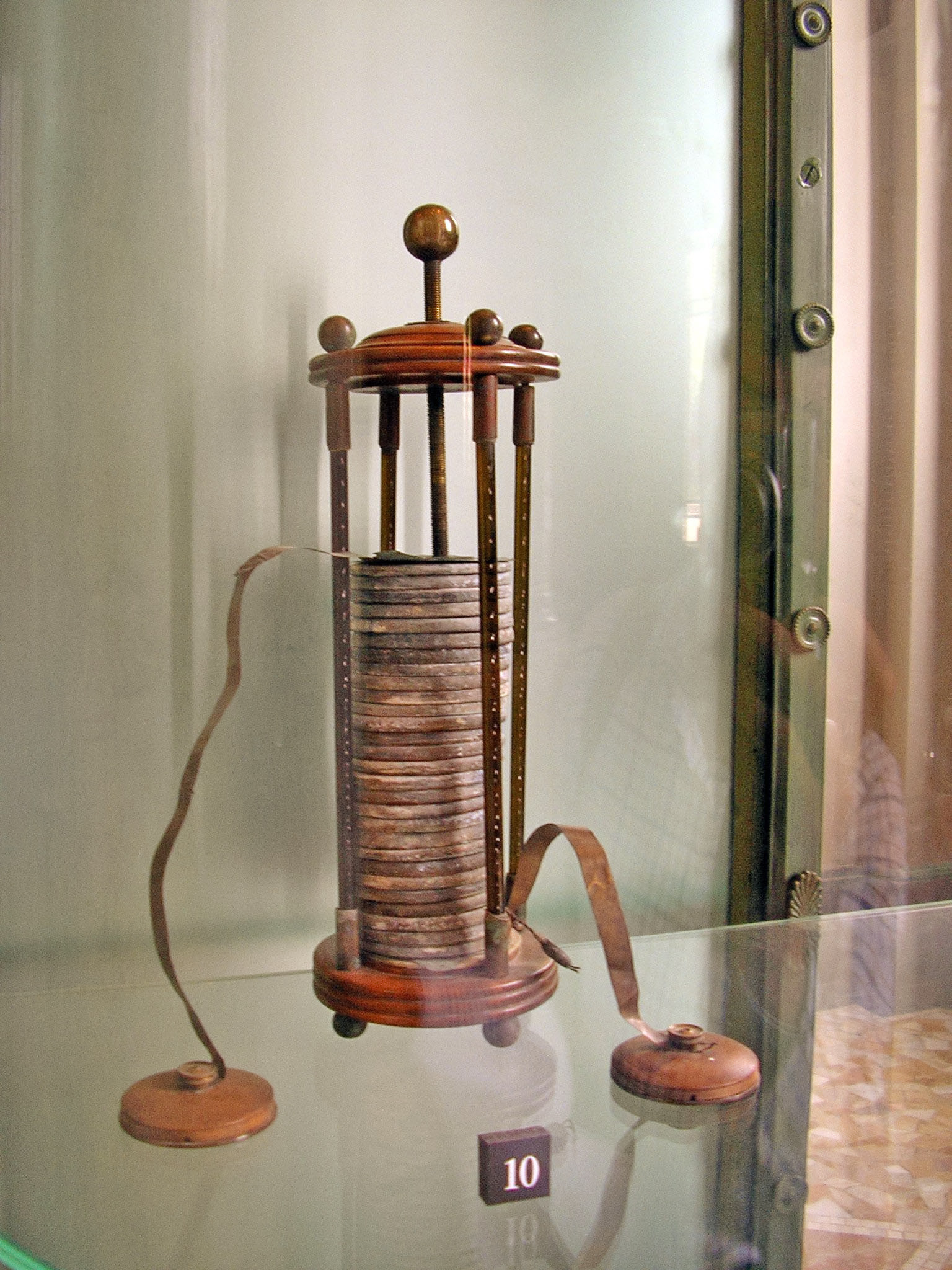
A voltaic pile on display in the Tempio Voltiano (the Volta Temple) near Volta's home in Como, Italy

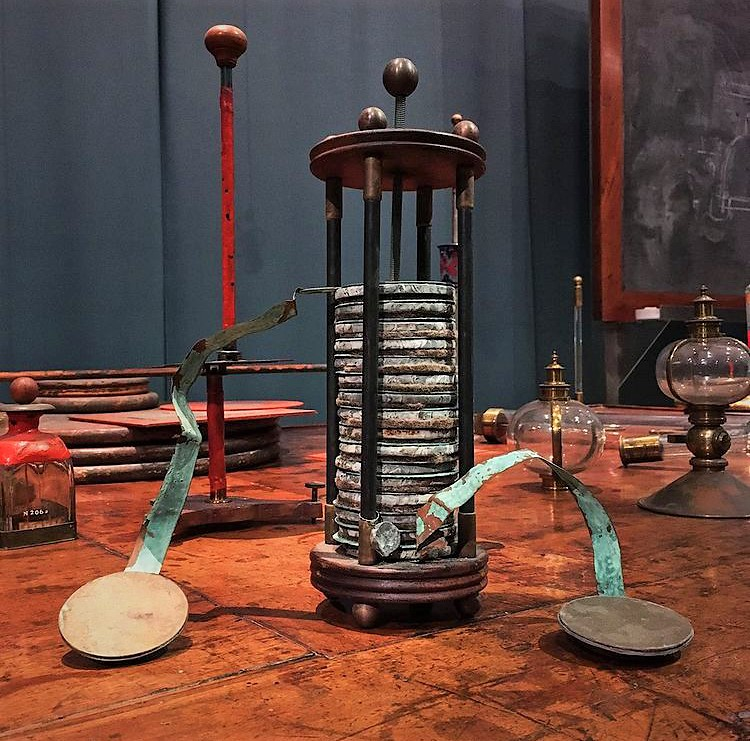
Voltaic pile, University History Museum of the University of Pavia.

The voltaic pile was the first electrical battery that could continuously provide an electric current to a circuit. It was invented by Italian chemist Alessandro Volta, who published his experiments in 1799. Its invention can be traced back to an argument between Volta and Luigi Galvani, Volta's fellow Italian scientist who had conducted experiments on frogs' legs. Use of the voltaic pile enabled a rapid series of other discoveries, including the electrical decomposition (electrolysis) of water into oxygen and hydrogen by William Nicholson and Anthony Carlisle (1800), and the discovery or isolation of the chemical elements sodium (1807), potassium (1807), calcium (1808), boron (1808), barium (1808), strontium (1808), and magnesium (1808) by Humphry Davy.

The entire 19th-century electrical industry was powered by batteries related to Volta's (e.g. the Daniell cell and Grove cell) until the advent of the dynamo (the electrical generator) in the 1870s.

== History ==
Volta's invention was built on Luigi Galvani's 1780s discovery that a circuit of two metals and a frog's leg can cause the frog's leg to respond. Volta demonstrated in 1794 that when two metals and brine-soaked cloth or cardboard are arranged in a circuit they too produce an electric current. In 1800, Volta stacked several pairs of alternating copper (or silver) and zinc discs (electrodes) separated by cloth or cardboard soaked in brine, which increased the total electromotive force. When the top and bottom contacts were connected by a wire, an electric current flowed through the voltaic pile and the connecting wire. This was the first "true" battery, that gave off continuous charge.

Many scientific instruments that belonged to Alessandro Volta are preserved in the University History Museum of the University of Pavia, where Volta taught from 1778 to 1819; the piles on display, unfortunately, are not original, as the ones preserved in Pavia were lent on the occasion of the centenary of the invention and subsequently lost in a fire.

== Applications ==
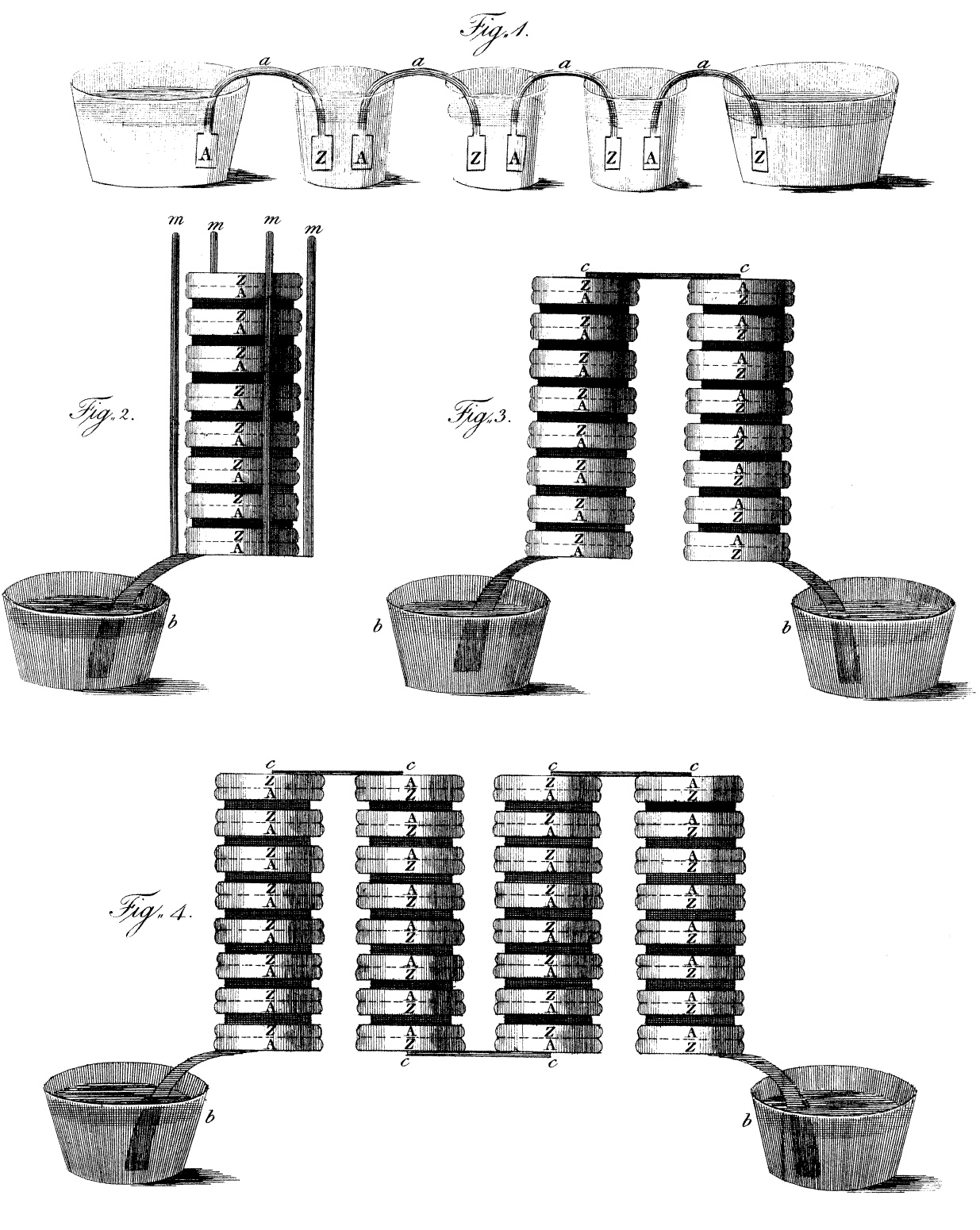
Drawing of the voltaic pile in different configurations, from the letter sent from Alessandro Volta to Joseph Banks.

On 20 March 1800, Alessandro Volta wrote to the London Royal Society to describe the technique for producing electric current using his device. On learning of the voltaic pile, William Nicholson and Anthony Carlisle used it to discover the electrolysis of water. Humphry Davy showed that the electromotive force, which drives the electric current through a circuit containing a single voltaic cell, was caused by a chemical reaction, not by the voltage difference between the two metals. He also used the voltaic pile to decompose chemicals and to produce new chemicals. William Hyde Wollaston showed that electricity from voltaic piles had identical effects to those of electricity produced by friction. In 1802 Vasily Petrov used voltaic piles in the discovery and research of electric arc effects.

Humphry Davy and Andrew Crosse were among the first to develop large voltaic piles. Davy used a 2000-pair pile made for the Royal Institution in 1808 to demonstrate carbon arc discharge and isolate five new elements: barium, calcium, boron, strontium and magnesium.

== Electrochemistry ==
Because Volta believed that the electromotive force occurred at the contact between the two metals, Volta's piles had a different design than the modern design illustrated on this page. His piles had one extra disc of copper at the top, in contact with the zinc, and one extra disc of zinc at the bottom, in contact with the copper. Expanding on Volta's work and the electro-magnetism work of his mentor Humphry Davy, Michael Faraday utilized both magnets and the voltaic pile in his experiments with electricity. Faraday believed that all "electricities" being studied at the time (voltaic, magnetic, thermal, and animal) were one and the same. His work to prove this theory led him to propose two laws of electrochemistry which stood in direct conflict with the current scientific beliefs of the day as laid down by Volta thirty years earlier. Because of their contributions to the understanding of this field of study, Faraday and Volta are both considered to be among the fathers of electrochemistry. The words "electrode" and "electrolyte", used above to describe Volta's work, are due to Faraday.

== Electromotive force ==
The strength of the pile is expressed in terms of its electromotive force, or emf, given in volts. Alessandro Volta's theory of contact tension considered that the emf, which drives the electric current through a circuit containing a voltaic cell, occurs at the contact between the two metals. Volta did not consider the electrolyte, which was typically brine in his experiments, to be significant. However, chemists soon realized that water in the electrolyte was involved in the pile's chemical reactions, and led to the evolution of hydrogen gas from the copper or silver electrode.

The modern, atomistic understanding of a cell with zinc and copper electrodes separated by an electrolyte is the following. When the cell is providing an electrical current through an external circuit, the metallic zinc at the surface of the zinc anode is oxidized and dissolves into the electrolyte as electrically charged ions (Zn^{2+}), leaving two negatively charged electrons (e^{−}) behind in the metal:

anode (oxidation): Zn Zn^{2+} + 2 e^{−}

This reaction is called oxidation. While zinc is entering the electrolyte, two positively charged hydrogen ions (H^{+}) from the electrolyte accept two electrons at the copper cathode surface, become reduced and form an uncharged hydrogen molecule (H_{2}):

cathode (reduction): 2 H^{+} + 2 e^{−} H_{2}

This reaction is called reduction. The electrons used from the copper to form the molecules of hydrogen are made up by an external wire or circuit that connects it to the zinc. The hydrogen molecules formed on the surface of the copper by the reduction reaction ultimately bubble away as hydrogen gas.

One will observe that the global electro-chemical reaction does not immediately involve the electrochemical couple Cu^{2+}/Cu (Ox/Red) corresponding to the copper cathode. The copper metal disk thus only serves here as a "chemically inert" noble metallic conductor for the transport of electrons in the circuit and does not chemically participate in the reaction in the aqueous phase. Copper does act as a catalyst for the hydrogen-evolution reaction, which otherwise could occur equally well (though at a slower rate in the absence of the catalyst) directly at the zinc electrode without current flow through the external circuit. The copper electrode could be replaced in the system by any sufficiently noble/inert and catalytically active metallic conductor (Ag, Pt, stainless steel, graphite, ...). The global reaction can be written as follows:

Zn + 2H^{+} Zn^{2+} + H_{2}

This is usefully stylized by means of the electro-chemical chain notation:

(anode: oxidation) Zn | Zn^{2+} || 2H^{+} | H_{2} | Cu (cathode: reduction)

in which a vertical bar each time represents an interface. The double vertical bar represents the interfaces corresponding to the electrolyte impregnating the porous cardboard disk.

When no current is drawn from the pile, each cell, consisting of zinc/electrolyte/copper, generates 0.76 V with a brine electrolyte. The voltages from the cells in the pile add, so the six cells in the diagram above generate 4.56 V of electromotive force.

== Dry piles ==
A number of high-voltage dry piles were invented between 1800 and the 1830s in an attempt to determine the source of electricity of the wet voltaic pile, and specifically to support Volta's hypothesis of contact tension. Indeed, Volta himself experimented with a pile whose cardboard discs had dried out, most likely accidentally.

The first to publish the discovery of a dry pile that produced a current was Johann Wilhelm Ritter in 1802, albeit in an obscure journal; over the next decade, it was announced repeatedly as a new discovery. One form of dry pile is the Zamboni pile. Francis Ronalds in 1814 was one of the first to realize that dry piles also worked through chemical reaction rather than metal-to-metal contact, even though corrosion was not visible due to the very small currents generated.

The dry pile could be referred to as the ancestor of the modern dry cell.

== See also ==
- List of battery types
- Salt water battery
- Aqueous lithium-ion battery
- Volta potential
- Leyden jar
