= Battery bunny =

Battery bunny may refer to either of the two mechanical bunnies that have appeared in advertisements for batteries:

- Duracell Bunny, launched in 1973 in North America, intended to be just a one-shot character, revived by Duracell after the success of Energizer's parody, but no longer appearing in North America because of trademark issues
- Energizer Bunny, launched in 1989, a parody of the Duracell Bunny
