= The Puttermans =

Fictional family in Duracell advertisements

The Puttermans are a fictional family that appeared in a series of advertisements for Duracell from 1994 to 1996.

== Background ==
The Puttermans were a family of plastic robots who outlasted others, thanks to their Duracell brand batteries (a playful reference to their deadpan 1970s ad campaign which featured head-to-head competition between toys). The campaign was made to combat the successful Energizer Bunny ad campaign. The fictional Brand X "other battery" depicted in the ad was made to look like rival Energizer batteries, much in the same way that Energizer's fictional rival "Supervolt" was made to resemble Duracell batteries. They also bore a slight resemblance to defunct Burgess batteries, which was likely coincidence.

The ad campaign was created by New York-based advertising agency Ogilvy & Mather. The original campaign was directed by Barry Sonnenfeld, whereas later executions (using the "No battery is stronger, longer" claim) were helmed by David Kellogg.

The characters were developed by special effects guru Steve Johnson and his company XFX, Inc. The actors were made up to look as if they were claymation or computer animation characters. The costumes consisted of boxy modular units of stiff foam rubber coated with urethane. The characters all had large copper-top batteries protruding from their backs and their faces were made of state-of-the-art latex prosthetics designed to heavily caricature the actors' own features, and complete character wardrobes. They tended to unsettle viewers, due to their non-human yet non-toy nor cartoon appearance, and the series of commercials was abandoned. At the time, the actor identities were not revealed to preserve the family's mystique.

== Characters ==
The family consisted of:

- Herb, the father (Keith Langsdale)
- Flo, his wife, the mother (Marla Frees)
- Son, Zack (Debi Derryberry)
- Daughter, Trish (Krystee Clark and Constance Zimmer)
- Grandma Putterman, who was actually played by a male actor (K.W. Miller)
- Aunt Gert (Lanie Zera)

Other Characters

- Larry Doty
- Todd
- Trish's two boyfriends.

== Plots ==
Some of the commercial plots included the following:

- The Puttermans attend a family reunion barbecue. A talkative relative shuts off mid-sentence and falls face first into a full plate, after Herb swapped her battery out for "one of those other batteries."
- Trish Putterman and boyfriend Bruce sit on a porch swing, and wish that their romantic night could go on forever with the help of Duracell.
- Grandma Putterman is so filled with energy, she can't stop dancing, even though she has been on the same battery "since the last ice age."
- The Putterman family go on a camping trip and find that their flashlights still work with the help of Duracell.
- Herb answers the front door and it's Trish's date who thinks batteries are batteries.
- Trish and Zack are in a drive thru and Todd, who has a crush on Trish, is working with an off brand battery.
- The family visits a museum of art and the museum director is using an off-brand battery, leading to a domino disaster.
- The family parrot is running low on batteries, Herb gives him a long lasting Duracell battery and he talks so much they take his cage outside.
- The family spends some time at the miniature golf course with a friend who's using an off brand battery.
- The family goes on a fishing trip while on vacation.

Halloween costumes of Herb and Flo, complete with latex masks, were released in North America.

On the December 3, 1994 episode of the sketch comedy show Saturday Night Live, as part of Weekend Update, anchor Norm Macdonald joked, "The new ad campaign for Duracell batteries is already having a dramatic effect. Over seventy percent of consumers say they now find the batteries, quote, 'creepy and disturbing'."
