= Aortoesophageal fistula =

- Specialty: Gastroenterology

An aortoesophageal fistula is a rarely-occurring abnormal fistula connection between the aorta and the esophagus. It may be caused by a problem in the aorta or in the esophagus, and must be repaired with surgery to avoid hemorrhage. Common causes include surgery on the aorta in adults, and ingestion of a button battery in children.
