= Constance Zimmer =

American actress (born 1970)

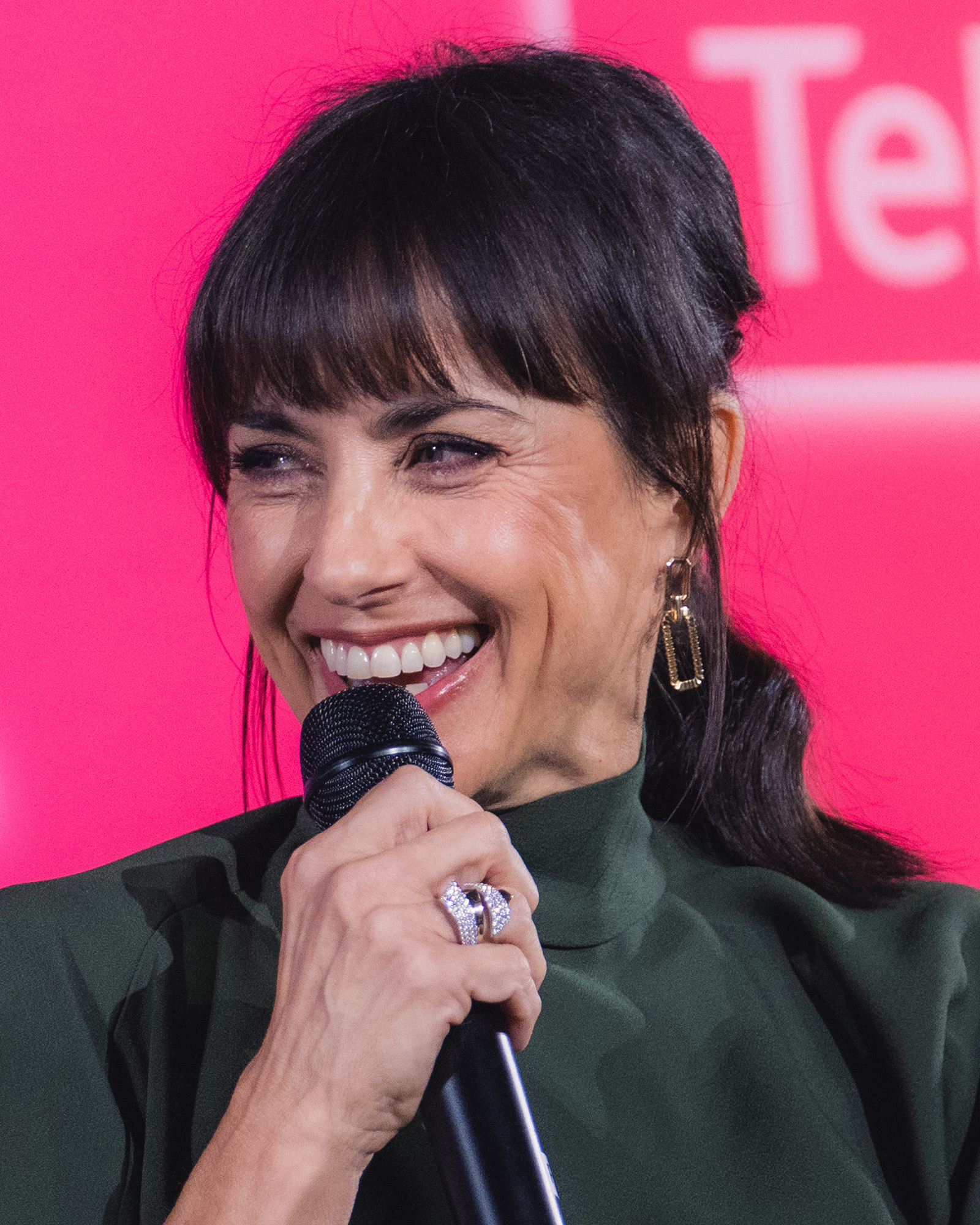
- Zimmer in 2026
- Born: October 11, 1970 (age 56); Seattle, Washington, U.S.
- Education: American Academy of Dramatic Arts
- Occupation: Actress
- Years active: 1993–present
- Spouses: Steve Johnson (m. 1999; div. 2001) Russ Lamoureux (m. 2010)
- Children: 1

Constance Zimmer (born October 11, 1970) is an American actress. She rose to prominence playing Dana Gordon on the HBO series Entourage (2005–11) and Claire Simms on the ABC series Boston Legal (2006–07). She went on to appear on the Netflix series House of Cards (2013–18) and voiced Strongarm on Transformers: Robots in Disguise (2014–17). She gained wider recognition for her role as Quinn King on Unreal (2015–18), for which she received a Critics' Choice Television Award and a Primetime Emmy Award nomination both in 2016.

== Early life and education ==
Zimmer was born in Seattle, Washington, to German immigrant parents from the former East Prussia. They divorced when she was very young. Zimmer also has an older sister. She speaks fluent German, saying in a 2015 interview that although her parents spoke English with her as a child, she spent six weeks of every summer in Germany, with her grandmother who only spoke German. Zimmer decided to pursue a career in acting after she fell in love with the craft as a high school student. Following high school, she was accepted to the American Academy of Dramatic Arts in Pasadena.

== Career ==
Zimmer's stage career was highlighted with her award-winning portrayal in a Los Angeles production of Catholic School Girls, where she won a Dramalogue for Best Actress. After starring in several national commercials, most notably for Duracell, she started making guest appearances in such shows as Ellen, Seinfeld, The X-Files, Gideon's Crossing, and The King of Queens, as well as having recurring roles in The Wayans Bros., Hyperion Bay, and The Trouble With Normal. During that same period, she was cast in a few independent films such as Spin Cycle, Home Room, and Warm Blooded Killers.

Zimmer eventually booked her first TV series regular role on the NBC comedy Good Morning, Miami as the lazy and burned-out office assistant, Penny Barrington. After the series was canceled, she spent the second season recurring as Sister Lilly Waters in the CBS drama, Joan of Arcadia, as well as guest-starring in episodes of NYPD Blue and Jake in Progress. Also in 2005, she acted in the short film Just Pray, directed by Tiffani Thiessen. It was accepted into the Tribeca Film Festival.

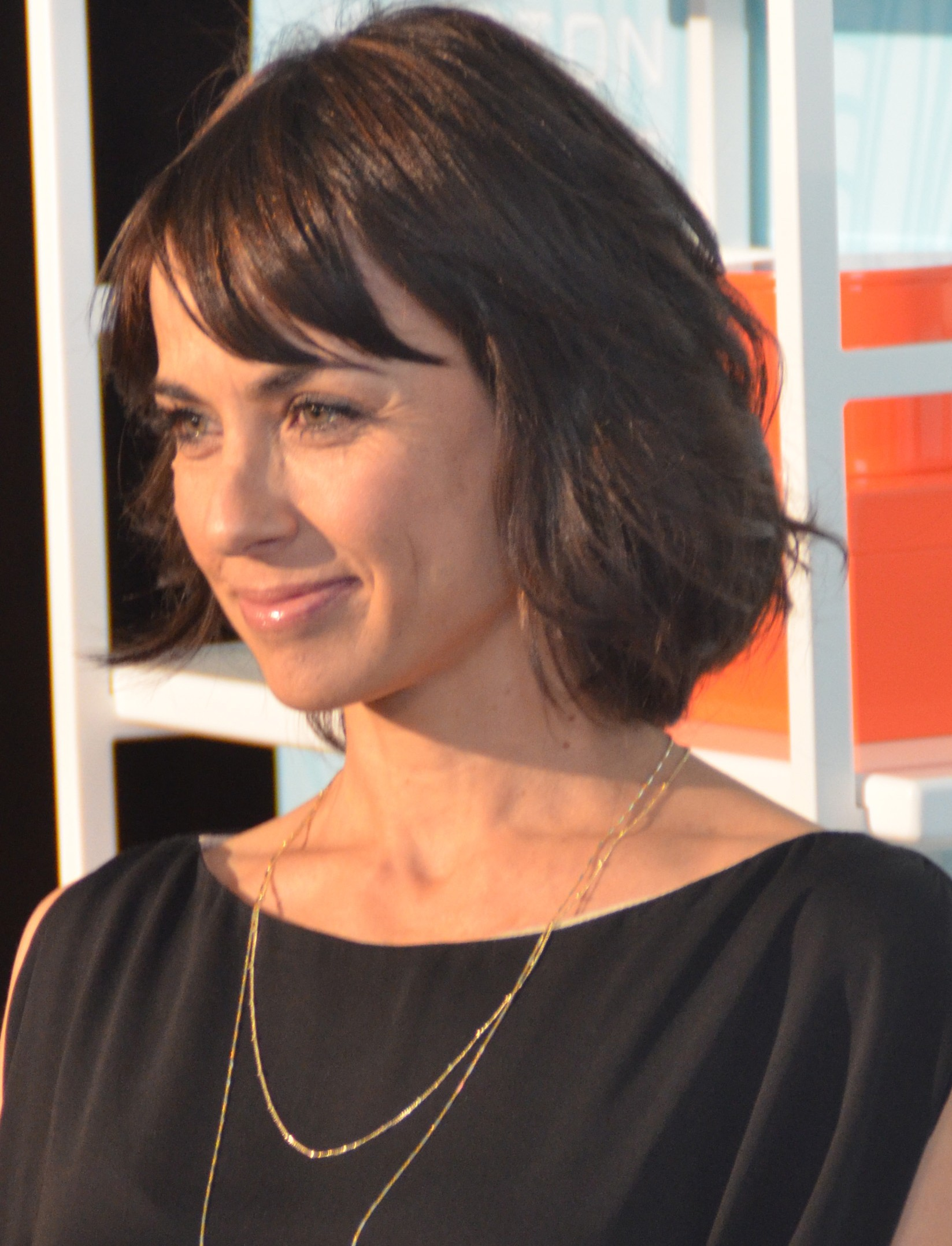
Zimmer at the 2014 Inspiration Awards Gala

In early 2006, Zimmer was cast as Brianna, the competitive law undergrad, in the ABC crime/drama series In Justice. She joined the cast of Boston Legal, where she played associate attorney Claire Simms on the show's third season. Along with regulars Rene Auberjonois, Julie Bowen, and Mark Valley, Zimmer was dropped by David E. Kelley at the end of season three. Zimmer also portrayed industry powerhouse and studio executive Dana Gordon in the HBO original series Entourage from 2005 to 2011, arguably her most known role to date.

Zimmer performed in the world-premiere play, Girls Talk, alongside Brooke Shields, Andrea Bendewald, and Nicole Paggi. The play was written and directed by Roger Kumble. She also starred in the NBC summer series Love Bites as Colleen Rouscher and had a guest appearance on USA's Royal Pains, playing psychiatrist Dr. Abby Burton.

In 2014, she was cast in the series regular role of Quinn King on the Lifetime dramedy series UnREAL. The show has received critical acclaim and Zimmer's performance has garnered high praise. The series ended in July 2018 after four seasons. For her performance in the series, she won a Critics' Choice Television Award for Best Supporting Actress in a Drama Series and received a nomination for the Primetime Emmy Award for Outstanding Supporting Actress in a Drama Series.

In 2015, she had a recurring role on season three of the ABC superhero series Agents of S.H.I.E.L.D. as Rosalind Price. She has been a semi-regular panelist on ABC's Match Game since 2017.

== Personal life ==
Zimmer has been married twice. First, to special effects artist Steve Johnson, whom she met when working on Duracell commercials featuring The Puttermans in the late 1990s.

On January 5, 2008, Zimmer gave birth to a daughter, Colette Zoe, whose father is director Russ Lamoureux. On June 20, 2010, it was announced that Zimmer and Lamoureux were engaged. They married in October of that year.

Zimmer attends many celebrity benefits for charity. Among those she supports are the Make-A-Wish Foundation, Natural Resources Defense Council, and Heifer International.

== Filmography ==
=== Film ===
Year	Title	Role	Notes
1998	Senseless	Zestfully Clean Woman	
1999	Warm Blooded Killers	Vicky Portenza	
2000	Spin Cycle	Echo	
2001	Farewell, My Love	Kyle	
2002	Home Room	Assistant Kelly	
2005	Just Pray	Corley James	Short film
2006	Damaged Goods	Angel	Short film
2007	The Hammer	Nicole	
2008	Chaos Theory	Peg the Teacher	
2008	AmericanEast	The Director	
2011	Demoted	Elizabeth Holland	
2012	St. Sebastian	Nurse	Unreleased
2012	The Babymakers	Mona	
2015	Entourage	Dana Gordon	
2015	Results	Mandy	
2015	Run the Tide	Lola	
2018	Burger Boss	Mother	Voice, short film
2019	Wonder Woman: Bloodlines	Veronica Cale	Voice, direct-to-video

=== Television ===
Year	Title	Role	Notes
1993	The Day My Parents Ran Away	Girl in Line	Television film
1994	Babylon 5	Young Woman Patient	Episode: "The Quality of Mercy"
1997	Quicksilver Highway	Female Patient	Television film
1997	Ellen	Riot Girl	Episode: "Just Coffee?"
1997	Unhappily Ever After	LaVerne	Episode: "Tiffany, the Home Wrecker"
1998	Seinfeld	Waitress #2	Episode: "The Wizard"
1998	Jenny	Kaleigh	Episode: "A Girl's Gotta Come through in a Clutch"
1998	Diagnosis: Murder	Lisa Blake	Episode: "An Education in Murder"
1998	Beverly Hills, 90210	Millie	Episode: "Reunion"
1998	The Wayans Bros.	Vanessa	2 episodes
1998	Felicity	Girl	Episode: "The Last Stand"
1998	The King of Queens	Jenny	Episode: "Fixer Upper"
1999	Chicago Hope	Dana	Episode: "A Goy and His Dog"
2000	The X-Files	Phoebe	Episode: "First Person Shooter"
2000	Rude Awakening	Sandi	Episode: "Star 80 Proof"
2000	Beyond Belief: Fact or Fiction	Mary	Episode: "The Find"
2000	Providence	Megan	2 episodes
2000–2001	The Trouble with Normal	Kristen	4 episodes
2001	Gideon's Crossing	Jessica Kagen	Episode: "Dr. Cherry Must Be Stopped"
2001	FreakyLinks	Tori Spangler	Episode: "Subject: The Stone Room"
2001	The Fighting Fitzgeralds	Beth	5 episodes
2001	Philly	Pamela Tommasino	Episode: "Blown Away"
2002	My Guide to Becoming a Rock Star	Siobahn! Ross	3 episodes
2002–2004	Good Morning, Miami	Penelope "Penny" Barnes Barrington	40 episodes
2003	Mystery Woman	Cassie Tilman / Cassie Thomas	Television film
2004	NYPD Blue	Zoe Prentiss	Episode: "Dress for Success"
2004–2005	Joan of Arcadia	Sister Lilly Watters	11 episodes
2005	Jake in Progress	Greta	Episode: "Henry Porter and the Coitus Interruptus"
2005–2006	Out of Practice	Naomi	2 episodes
2005–2011	Entourage	Dana Gordon	21 episodes
2006	In Justice	Brianna	13 episodes
2006–2007	Boston Legal	Claire Simms	23 episodes
2007	Notes from the Underbelly	Kelly	Episode: "Oleander"
2009	Pushing Daisies	Coco Juniper	Episode: "Window Dressed to Kill"
2009	Cupid	Hallie Butler	Episode: "The Great Right Hope"
2009	The New Adventures of Old Christine	Amy Hunter	2 episodes
2011	Love Bites	Colleen Rouscher	7 episodes
2011	Royal Pains	Dr. Abby Burton	Episode: "A Little Art, A Little Science"
2013	Grey's Anatomy	Dr. Alana Cahill	5 episodes
2013	The Newsroom	Taylor Warren	5 episodes
2013–2018	House of Cards	Janine Skorsky	19 episodes
2014	Hot in Cleveland	Lilly	Episode: "Stayin' Alive"
2015–2017	Transformers: Robots in Disguise	Strongarm, Filch	Voice, 68 episodes
2015–2018	Unreal	Quinn King	38 episodes
2015	Complications	Dr. Laster	2 episodes
2015	Agents of S.H.I.E.L.D.	Rosalind Price	8 episodes
2016	Maron	Lindsey	Episode: "Step 1"
2016	Better Things	Herself	Episode: "Sam/Pilot"
2016	BoJack Horseman	Skinny Gina, Lindsey	Voice, 4 episodes
2017	Angie Tribeca	Detective Goldstein	Episode: "Hey, I'm Solvin' Here!"
2017–2025	Match Game	Panelist	11 episodes
2018	RuPaul's Drag Race: All Stars	Herself	Episode: "The Bitchelor"
2018	Mom	Professor Stevens	Episode: "Ambulance chasers and a Babbling Brook"
2018–2019	A Million Little Things	Jeri Huntington	3 episodes
2019–2020	Shameless	Claudia Nicolo	5 episodes
2020	Condor	Robin Larkin	6 episodes
2021–2022	Good Trouble	Kathleen Gale	18 episodes; also director (3 episodes)
2022	Big Sky	Alicia Corrigan	9 episodes
2022	The Calling	Anna Harvey	4 episodes
2023	Harlan Coben's Shelter	Shira Bolitar	8 episodes
2023	The Boy in The Walls	Director	
2026	The Lincoln Lawyer	Dana Berg	10 episodes
2026	Love Story	Ann Messina Freeman	3 episodes

=== Podcasts ===
Year	Title	Role	Notes	Ref.
2020–2021	The Shadow Diaries	Marilyn Rose	Voice role	

=== Other roles ===
==== Advertising ====
Year	Title	Role	Notes	Ref.
1995-1996	The Puttermans	Trish	Duracell commercials	

== Awards and nominations ==
Year	Award	Category	Nominated work	Result
2008	14th Screen Actors Guild Awards	Outstanding Performance by an Ensemble in a Drama Series (shared with the others)	Boston Legal	Nominated
2016	6th Critics' Choice Television Awards	Best Supporting Actress in a Drama Series	Unreal	Won
2016	5th BTVA Voice Acting Awards	Best Vocal Ensemble in a New Television Series (shared with the others)	Transformers: Robots in Disguise	Won
2016	20th OFTA Television Awards	Best Supporting Actress in a Drama Series	Unreal	Nominated
2016	14th Gold Derby Awards	Best Drama Supporting Actress	Unreal	Nominated
2016	68th Primetime Emmy Awards	Outstanding Supporting Actress in a Drama Series	Unreal	Nominated
2016	7th Critics' Choice Television Awards	Best Supporting Actress in a Drama Series	Unreal	Nominated
2017	6th BTVA Voice Acting Awards	Best Vocal Ensemble in a Television Series (shared with the others)	Transformers: Robots in Disguise	Nominated
2026	78th Primetime Emmy Awards	Outstanding Supporting Actress in a Limited or Anthology Series or Movie	Love Story: John F. Kennedy Jr. & Carolyn Bessette	Nominated
