= P. R. Mallory and Co Inc =

Producer of dry cell batteries

P. R. Mallory
- Industry: Electronics
- Founded: 1916; 110 years ago
- Founder: Philip Mallory
- Products: Batteries

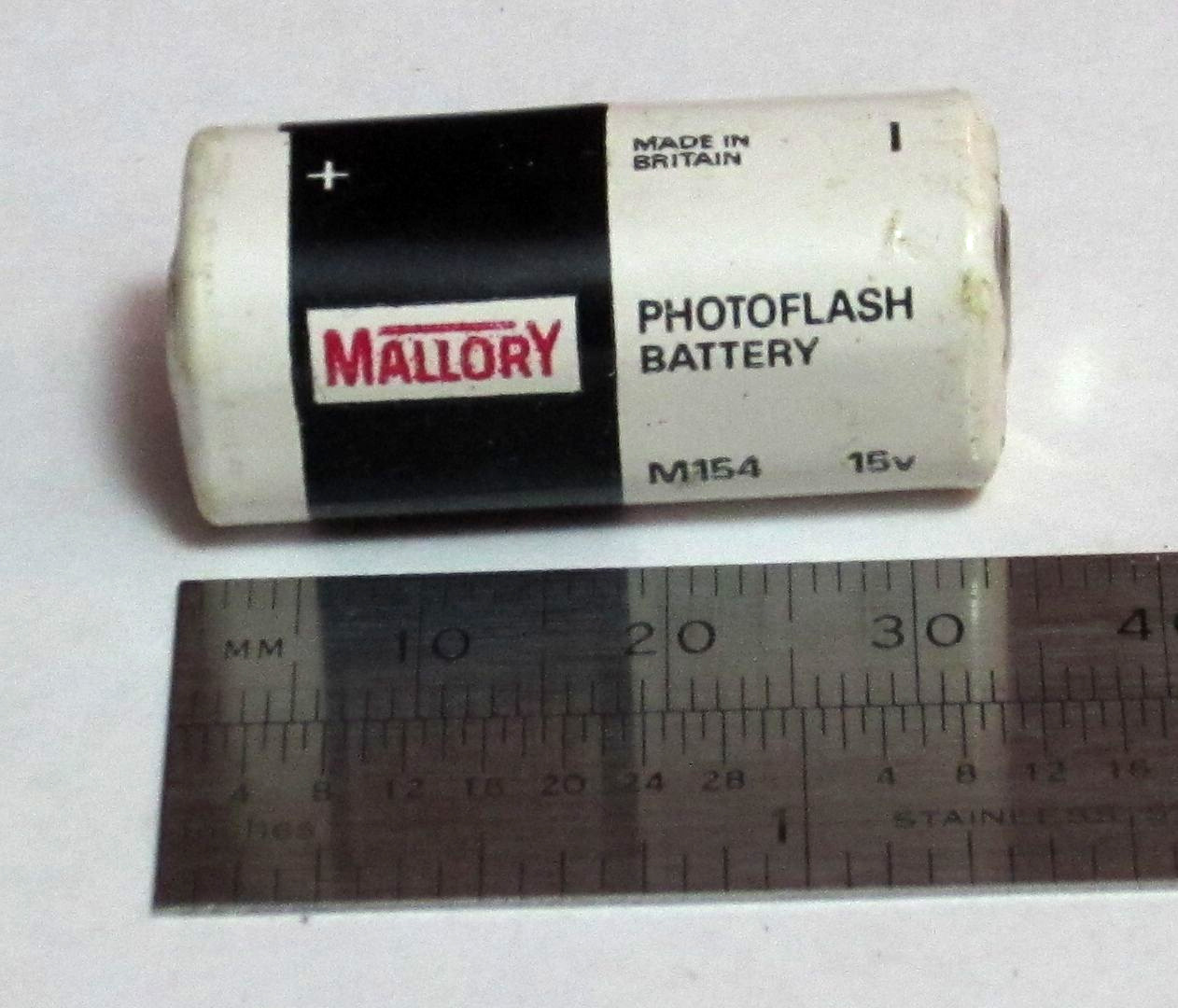
A photoflash battery with the Mallory logo.

P. R. Mallory and Co Inc was a US producer of dry cell batteries (Mercury; alkaline Duracell), electronic components including electrolytic capacitors, and audible warning devices ("Sonalert"). It also was the parent firm of Mallory Batteries Ltd., an Irish producer of Ever Ready batteries. British Ever Ready (Note: While the British "Ever Ready" was founded as a subsidiary of the American "Ever-Ready" (later "Eveready") in 1906, it became an independent business in 1914 and had long been separate from its former parent by this point.) had a large stake in it by World War II and had a close relationship with Mallory by the late 1960s (in the US, "Eveready" batteries were a trademark of Union Carbide, which had no relationship with P. R. Mallory).

Scientists George Wallis and Daniel I. Pomerantz at P. R. Mallory and Co discovered anodic bonding of glass to silicon. Their work was published in 1969 in the Journal of Applied Physics and is protected under U.S. Patent No 3,397,278.

== History ==
The company was founded in 1916 by Philip Rogers Mallory, and initially manufactured tungsten wire for lamp filaments. The P.R. Mallory Company also manufactured resistance welding electrodes. In 1924 the company moved its headquarters to 3029 East Washington Street in Indianapolis, Indiana, and had several divisions besides Duracell batteries including Mallory Capacitor Company with manufacturing plants in Greencastle, Indiana; Huntsville, Alabama; Waynesboro, Tennessee; and Glasgow, Kentucky. Mallory Controls had a manufacturing plant in Frankfort, Indiana, and Mallory Distributor Products had a plant in Indianapolis.

In 1942, inventor Samuel Ruben, with Mallory, developed a practical balanced form of mercury battery that was used for portable electronic equipment during World War II.

In the 1950s the company had developed a powerful alkaline AAA cell for use in a Kodak camera flash, but the Kodak company required Mallory to license the design to competitors to ensure availability in the consumer market. In 1957, the company sold stock. In 1960, founder P.R. Mallory gave control of the company to his son G. Barron Mallory, who was chairman from 1960 to 1968 and active on the board for many years afterward. The company began manufacturing batteries at plants in Kentucky and Tennessee in 1960 and 1961. The company registered its "Duracell" trademark in 1964 and began rebranding under the new name with the intent of marketing directly to consumers instead of industrial and military customers.

In 1978, the company was purchased by Dart Industries and renamed Duracell after its alkaline battery brand. In 1985, the European metal alloys parts of the former P.R. Mallory company were collected under the names "Mallory Corporation" and "Mallory Alloys Group".

== See also ==
- Eveready East Africa
- Ucar batteries
- British Ever Ready Electrical Company

== Bibliography ==
- Wallis, George; Pomerantz, Daniel I. (September 1969). "Field Assisted Glass‐Metal Sealing". Journal of Applied Physics. 40 (10): 3946–3949. doi:10.1063/1.1657121.
- "1940 Ad Mallory Welding Electrodes Bike Swisher V M". Period Paper Historic Art LLC.
