= Mercury battery =

Nonrechargeable battery cell

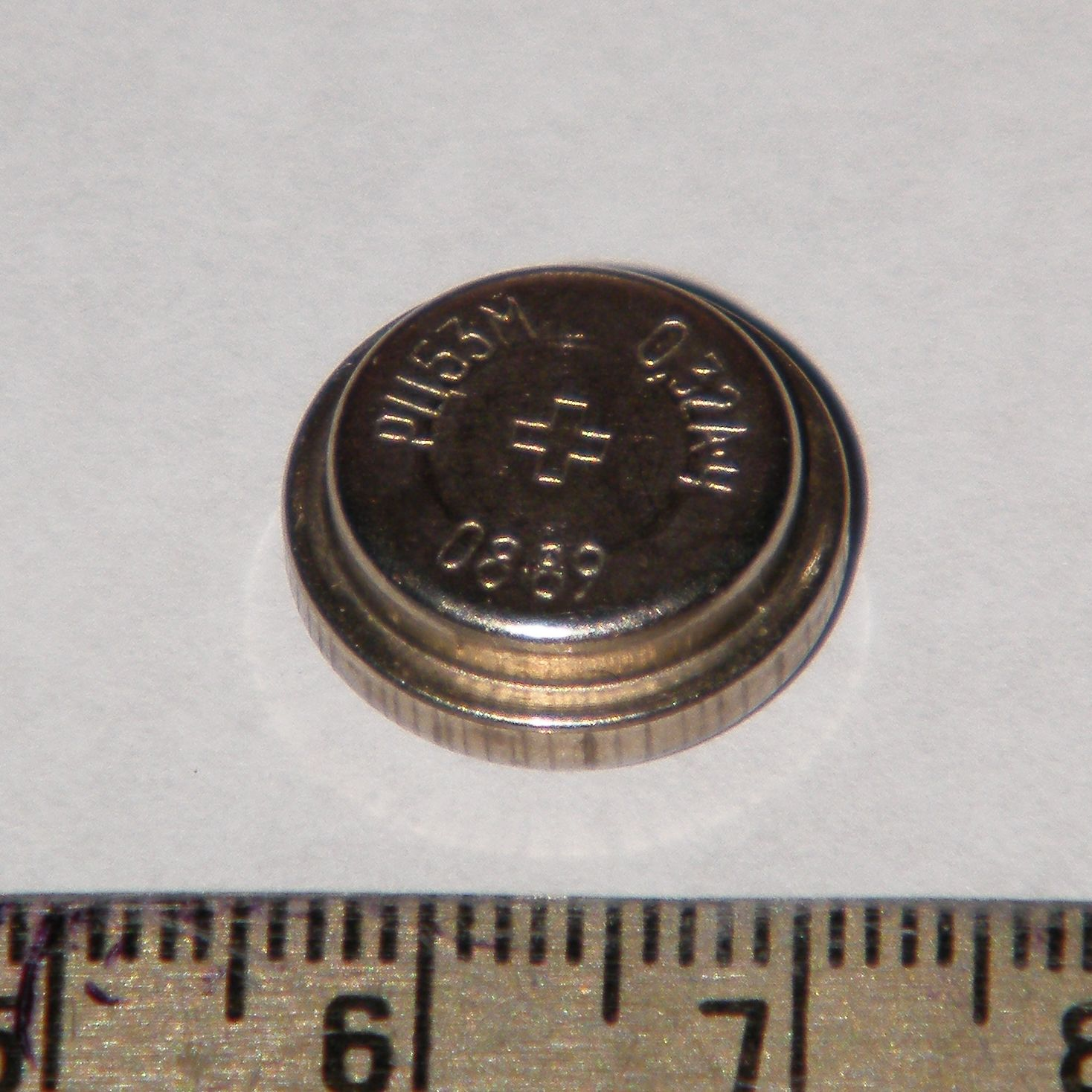
Mercury battery "РЦ-53М"(RTs-53M), Russian manufactured in 1989

A mercury battery (also called mercuric oxide battery, mercury cell, button cell, or Ruben-Mallory) is a non-rechargeable electrochemical battery, a primary cell. Mercury batteries use a reaction between mercuric oxide and zinc electrodes in an alkaline electrolyte. The voltage during discharge remains practically constant at 1.35 volts, and the capacity is much greater than that of a similarly sized zinc-carbon battery. Mercury batteries were used in the shape of button cells for watches, hearing aids, cameras and calculators, and in larger forms for other applications.

For a time during and after World War II, batteries made with mercury became a popular power source for portable electronic devices. Due to the content of toxic mercury and environmental concerns about its disposal, the sale of mercury batteries has been banned in many countries. Both ANSI and IEC have withdrawn their standards for mercury batteries.

Cross section through a button-type mercury battery

== History ==
The mercury oxide-zinc battery system was known since the 19th century, but did not become widely used until 1942, when Samuel Ruben developed a balanced mercury cell which was useful for military applications such as metal detectors, munitions, and walkie-talkies. The battery system had the advantages of long shelf life (up to 10 years) and steady voltage output. After the Second World War the battery system was widely applied for small electronic devices such as cardiac pacemakers and hearing aids. Mercury oxide batteries were made in a range of sizes from miniature button cells used for hearing aids and electric wrist watches, cylindrical types used for portable electronic apparatus, rectangular batteries used for transistor radios, and large multicell packs used for industrial applications such as radio remote control for overhead crane systems. In the United States, mercury oxide batteries were manufactured by companies including P. R. Mallory and Co Inc, (now Duracell), Union Carbide Corporation (whose former battery division is now called Energizer Holdings), RCA Corporation, and Burgess Battery Company.

== Chemistry ==
Mercury batteries use either pure mercury(II) oxide (HgO)—also called mercuric oxide—or a mixture of HgO with manganese dioxide (MnO_{2}) as the cathode. Mercuric oxide is a non-conductor, so some graphite is mixed with it; the graphite also helps prevent collection of mercury into large droplets. The half-reaction at the cathode is:

$$\ce{HgO + H2O + 2e- -> Hg + 2OH-}$$

with a standard potential of +0.0977 V.

The anode is made of zinc (Zn) and separated from the cathode with a layer of paper or other porous material soaked with electrolyte; this is known as a salt bridge. Two half-reactions occur at the anode. The first consists of an electrochemical reaction step:

$$\ce{Zn + 4 OH- -> Zn(OH)4^2- + 2e-}$$

followed by the chemical reaction step:

$$\ce{Zn(OH)4^2- -> ZnO + 2OH- + H2O}$$

yielding an overall anode half-reaction of:

$$\ce{Zn + 2OH- -> ZnO + H2O + 2e-}$$

The overall reaction for the battery is:

$$\ce{Zn + HgO -> ZnO + Hg}$$

In other words, during discharge, zinc is oxidized (loses electrons) to become zinc oxide (ZnO) while the mercuric oxide gets reduced (gains electrons) to form elemental mercury. A little extra mercuric oxide is put into the cell to prevent evolution of hydrogen gas at the end of life.

=== Electrolyte ===
Sodium hydroxide or potassium hydroxide are used as an electrolyte. Sodium hydroxide cells have nearly constant voltage at low discharge currents, making them ideal for hearing aids, calculators, and electronic watches. Potassium hydroxide cells, in turn, provided constant voltage at higher currents, making them suitable for applications requiring current surges, e.g. photographic cameras with flash, and watches with a backlight. Potassium hydroxide cells also have better performance at lower temperatures. Mercury cells have very long shelf life, up to 10 years.

=== Mercuric oxide and cadmium ===
A different form of mercury battery uses mercuric oxide and cadmium. This has a much lower terminal voltage around 0.9 volts and so has lower energy density, but it has an extended temperature range, in special designs up to 180 C. Because cadmium has low solubility in the alkaline electrolyte, these batteries have long storage life. A 12 volt battery of this type was formerly used for residential smoke detectors. It was designed as a series stack of cells, where one cell had a reduced capacity resulting in a very distinct two-step voltage discharge characteristic. When reaching the end of its life, this smaller cell would discharge first causing the battery terminal voltage to drop sharply by 0.9 volts. This provided a very predictable and repeatable way to warn users the battery needed replacement while the larger capacity cells kept the unit functioning normally.

== Electrical characteristics ==
Mercury batteries using a mercury(II) oxide cathode have a very flat discharge curve, holding constant 1.35 V (open circuit) voltage until about the last 5% of their lifetime, when their voltage drops rapidly. The voltage remains within 1% for several years at light load, and over a wide temperature range, making mercury batteries useful as a voltage reference in electronic instruments and in photographic light meters.

Mercury batteries with cathodes made of a mix of mercuric oxide and manganese dioxide have output voltage of 1.4 V and a more sloped discharge curve.

== Product ban ==
The 1991 European Commission directive 91/157, when adopted by member states, prohibited the marketing of certain types of batteries containing more than 25 milligrams of mercury, or, in the case of alkaline batteries, more than 0.025% by weight of mercury. In 1998 the ban was extended to cells containing more than 0.005% by weight of mercury.

In 1992, the state of New Jersey prohibited sales of mercury batteries. In 1996, the United States Congress passed the Mercury-Containing and Rechargeable Battery Management Act that prohibited further sale of mercury-containing batteries (with an exception for up to 25 mg of mercury per button cell). In some specific cases large mercury-containing batteries can continue to be produced if manufacturers provide a system to collect waste batteries and a reclamation facility.

== Substitutes ==
The ban on sale of mercury oxide batteries caused numerous problems for photographers, whose equipment frequently relied on their advantageous discharge curves and long lifetime. Alternatives used are zinc-air batteries, with similar discharge curve, high capacity, but much shorter lifetime (a few months), and poor performance in dry climates; alkaline batteries with voltage widely varying through their lifetime; and silver-oxide batteries with higher voltage (1.55 V) and very flat discharge curve, which makes them possibly the best, though expensive, replacement after recalibrating the meter to the new voltage.

Special adapters with voltage dropping Schottky or germanium diodes allow silver oxide batteries to be used in equipment designed for mercury batteries. Since the voltage drop is a non-linear function of the current flow, diodes do not produce a very accurate solution for applications where the current flow varies significantly. Currents drawn by old CdS light meters are typically in the 10 μA to 200 μA range (e.g. Minolta SR-T equipment series). Various kinds of active voltage regulation circuits using SMD transistors or integrated circuits have been devised, however, they are often difficult to integrate into the cramped battery compartment space. Replacements must operate with minimal voltage drop on the already very low voltage produced by a single battery cell, and the lack of a power switch on many traditional light meters and cameras makes an ultra-low power (ULP) or extreme-low power (XLP) design necessary. Many old devices also have their chassis connected to the battery's positive rather than its negative terminal - if this cannot be changed, the necessary negative voltage regulator design further reduces the choice of suitable electronic parts.

== Use in zinc batteries ==
Formerly, the zinc anodes of dry cells were amalgamated with mercury, to prevent side-reactions of the zinc with the electrolyte that would reduce the service life of the battery. The mercury took no part in the chemical reaction for the battery. Manufacturers have changed to a purer grade of zinc, so amalgamation is no longer required and mercury is eliminated from the dry cell.

== See also ==
- List of battery types
- List of battery sizes
- Comparison of battery types
- Battery recycling
- Battery nomenclature
