= Philip Mallory =

American businessman

Philip Rogers Mallory
- Born: November 11, 1885
- Died: November 16, 1975 (aged 90)
- Occupation: Founder of Duracell International

Philip Rogers Mallory (November 11, 1885 - November 16, 1975) was an American businessman and the founder of the company that is now known as Duracell International. Rather than making a career in his family's shipping business, he founded his own manufacturing company, the P. R. Mallory Company. Starting as a manufacturer of tungsten filament wire, his company later became The Mallory Battery Company and is now known as Duracell International.

== Early life and education ==
He attended Yale and Columbia universities.

== Business ==
In 1942, Samuel Ruben and Mallory developed the mercury cell which was considered a breakthrough in battery manufacturing.

== Sailing ==
Mallory served as Commodore of American Yacht Club in the 1920s.
