= Duracell =

Battery and smart power system manufacturer of the United States

Duracell Inc.
- Logo since 2013

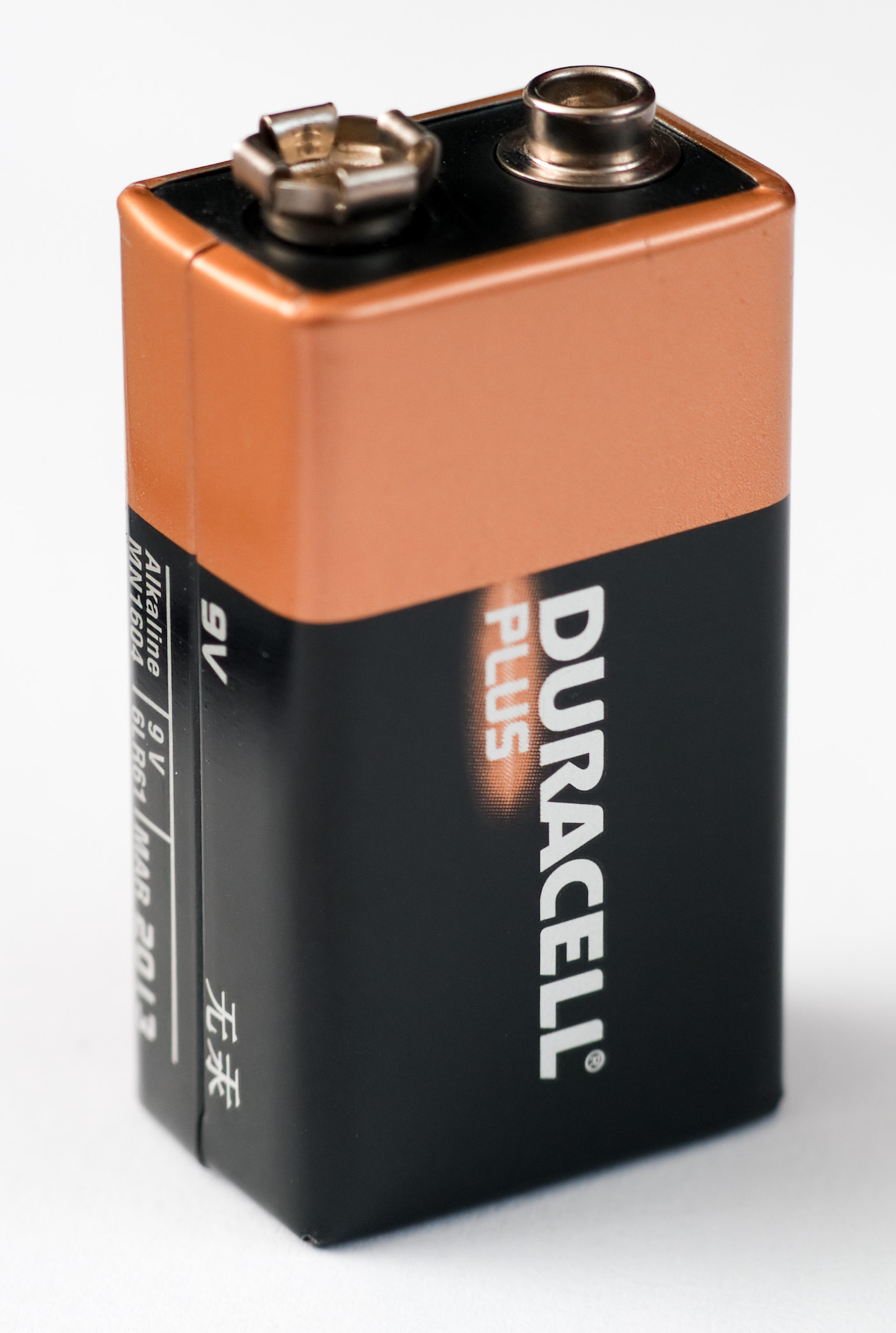
- 9V Duracell battery
- Type: Subsidiary
- Founded: 1924; 102 years ago (as P.R. Mallory Company)
- Founders: Philip Mallory
- Headquarters: Chicago, Illinois, U.S. Atlanta, Georgia, U.S.
- Products: Batteries
- Number of employees: 3,153 (2024)
- Parent: Dart Industries (1978–1980); Kraft Foods Inc. (1980–1988); Kohlberg Kravis Roberts (1988–1989); The Gillette Company (1996–2005); Procter & Gamble (2005–2016); Berkshire Hathaway (2016–present)
- Subsidiaries: Duracell (UK) Limited; Duracell China Limited; Duracell Batteries BV; Duracell Batteries Limited
- Website: duracell.com procell.com

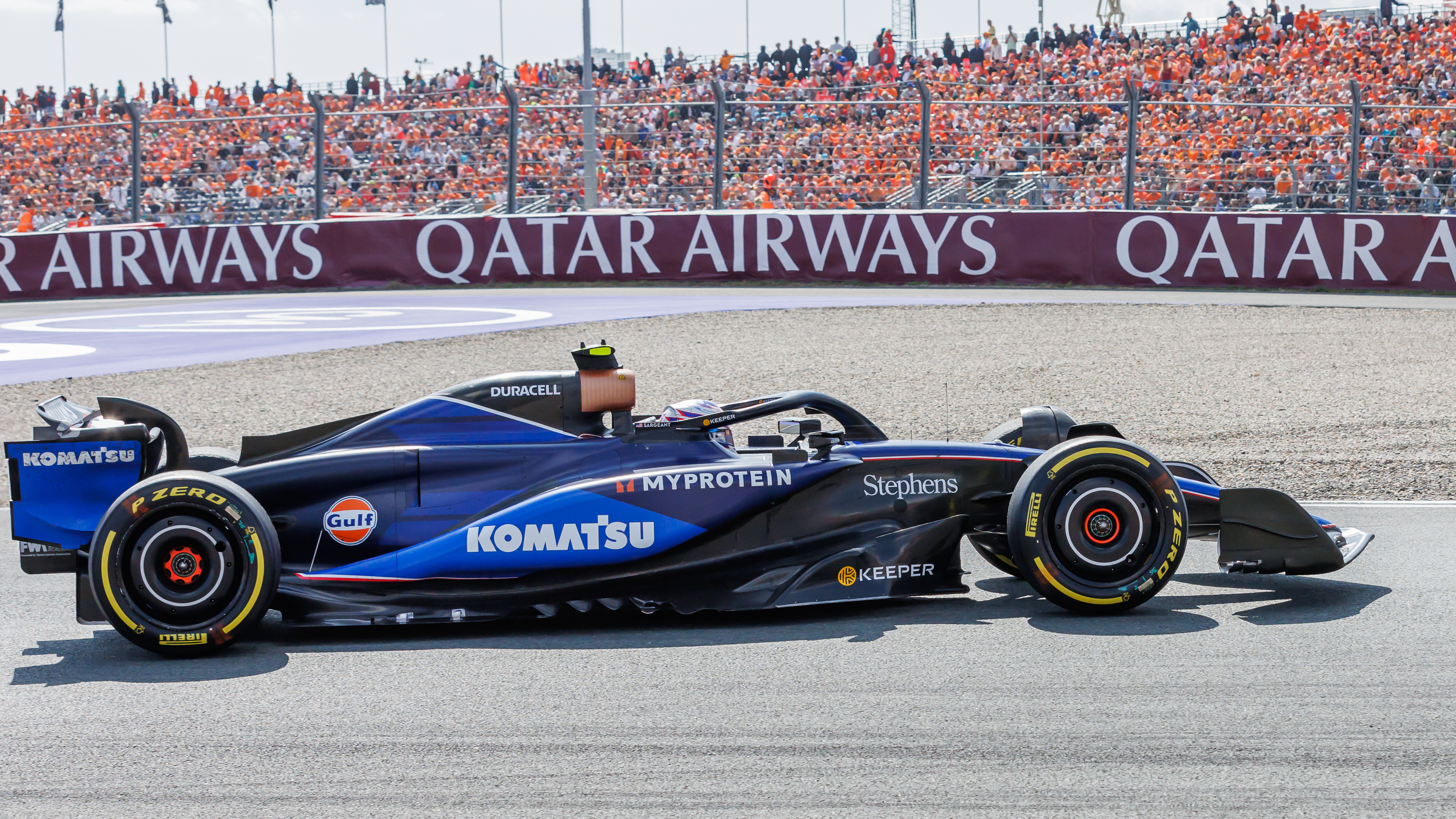
Duracell advertising on the vertical air intake of the Williams FW46

Duracell Inc. is an American manufacturer of alkaline batteries, specialty cells, and rechargeables; it is a wholly owned subsidiary of Berkshire Hathaway since 2016. The company has its origins in the 1920s, through the work of Samuel Ruben and Philip Mallory, and the formation of the P. R. Mallory Company.

Through a number of corporate mergers and acquisitions, Duracell came to be owned by the consumer products conglomerate Procter & Gamble (P&G). In November 2014, P&G reached an agreement to sell the company to the international conglomeration Berkshire Hathaway through a transfer of shares. Under the deal, Berkshire Hathaway exchanged the shares it held in P&G for ownership of the Duracell business.

In 2025, alkaline batteries accounted for approximately 48% of the global primary battery market, and the alkaline battery market was valued at $9.75 billion. Duracell was one of the largest players, along with Energizer and Panasonic.

== History ==
=== Origins ===
Duracell originated via the partnership of scientist Samuel Ruben and businessman Philip Rogers Mallory, who met during the 1920s. The P. R. Mallory Company of Burlington, Massachusetts, United States, relocated its headquarters to Indianapolis, Indiana, in 1924. The company produced mercury batteries for military equipment, trumping the carbon-zinc batteries used then in virtually all applications.

In 1956, P. R. Mallory & Co. acquired General Dry Batteries, Inc. (GDB) with headquarters in Cleveland, Ohio. GDB was then the third-largest U. S. manufacturer of zinc-carbon batteries and had made mercury batteries under license from P. R. Mallory during and post World War II until its acquisition in 1956.

During the 1950s, Kodak introduced cameras with a bulb flash. The design required a new zinc-carbon cell size; AAA was introduced.

In 1960s, the term "Duracell" was introduced as a brand, from "durable cell". Until 1980, the batteries also bore the Mallory brand.

=== Developments ===
P. R. Mallory was acquired by Dart Industries in 1978, which in turn, merged with Kraft in 1980. Kohlberg Kravis Roberts bought Duracell in 1988 and took the company public in 1989. It was acquired for $7 billion by the Gillette Company in 1996.

In 2005, Procter & Gamble acquired Duracell's parent Gillette for $57 billion.

In September 2011, Duracell and Powermat Technologies Ltd. started a joint venture, called Duracell Powermat, to make small wireless chargers for mobile phones and small electronics, with P&G owning 55% of the joint venture shares and Powermat 45%.

In March 2012, along with Powermat Technologies, Duracell, under the Procter & Gamble corporate umbrella, founded the Power Matters Alliance (PMA), an alliance of leading industry and governmental organizations that is dedicated to advancing smart and environmentally sound wireless power. AT&T and Starbucks joined the board later that year.

In 2013, the company released a "Duracell Quantum" line as their top-performing alkaline batteries.

=== P&G spin-off and Berkshire Hathaway ownership ===
On October 24, 2014, Procter & Gamble announced it would spin off Duracell in 2015 as part of a wider restructuring scheme. On November 14, 2014, Berkshire Hathaway declared its intent to acquire Duracell in an all-stock deal, consisting of $4.7 billion worth of P&G stock then owned by Berkshire Hathaway. The acquisition received regulatory approval from the European Commission in July 2015.

The transfer was completed on February 29, 2016, with P&G investing $1.8 billion in cash into Duracell, and Berkshire Hathaway giving P&G back 52 million shares.

In September 2016, Duracell announced plans to move its executive team and 60 employees to Chicago.

=== Recent developments ===
In July 2022, Duracell launched a home energy storage solution through California distributor Power Center+. The Duracell Power Center product line consists of 5 kW and 10 kW inverter products with lithium iron phosphate batteries that can be expanded from 14 kWh to 84 kWh. Its Power Center AC connection allows new and existing solar owners to harvest excess solar energy for use when needed.

In February 2025, Duracell established its new global headquarters for research and development in Atlanta, Georgia, US, with an investment of $56 million.

== Products ==
Duracell manufactures alkaline batteries in many common sizes, such as AAA, AA, C, D, and 9V. Lesser-used sizes such as AAAA (primarily for pagers, penlights, and blood glucose meters) and J size batteries (for hospital devices and photographic strobe flash units) are also manufactured and a range of "button cells" using zinc-air, silver-oxide, and lithium chemistries, used in calculators, watches, hearing aids, and other small (mostly medical-related) devices.

Duracell entered into a brand licensing agreement with flash memory manufacturer Dane-Elec in 2008 for a line of products including memory cards, hard drives and USB flash drives with the Duracell brand mark and in the brand's trademark "copper top" coloring.

Duracell also manufactures specialty batteries, including NiMH rechargeable batteries and batteries for cameras, watches, hearing aids, etc. Their two main battery brands are "CopperTop (Plus)," marketed as longer-lasting, and "Ultra," directed mainly at users of digital devices and devices that need more power. Duracell also markets some lithium batteries and car batteries.

Duracell manufactures alkaline and lithium batteries in prismatic as well as cylindrical shape. In 2006, Duracell introduced "Power Pix" batteries with NiOx technology, designed to power digital cameras and other high-drain devices for up to twice as long as alkaline batteries.

Duracell's professional batteries have been sold in the United States and Europe under the brand name "Procell" (previously "Industrial by Duracell" and "Duracell Procell"). Two main product lines are currently sold under the Procell brand, "Procell Alkaline" and "Procell Intense Power", intended to provide longer endurance by tailoring the power profile of the batteries to the requirements of the device. "Procell Alkaline" are designed for use in low-drain applications such as clocks, and Procell Intense Power is designed for higher-drain devices.

In the 1980s, the company briefly had a line of flashlights called Durabeam, which was successful.

Duracell products
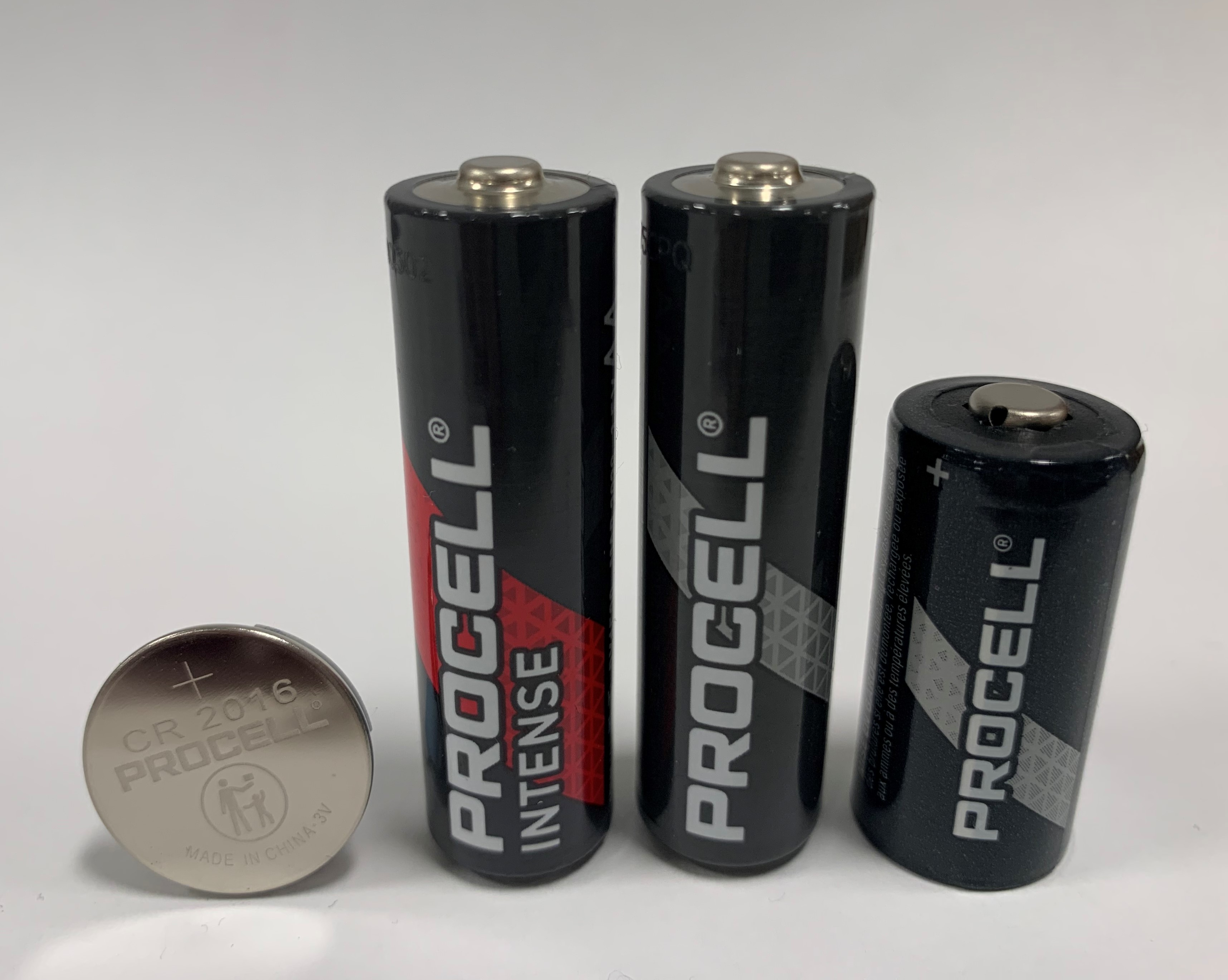
Various Procell batteries from the Alkaline & Intense product ranges

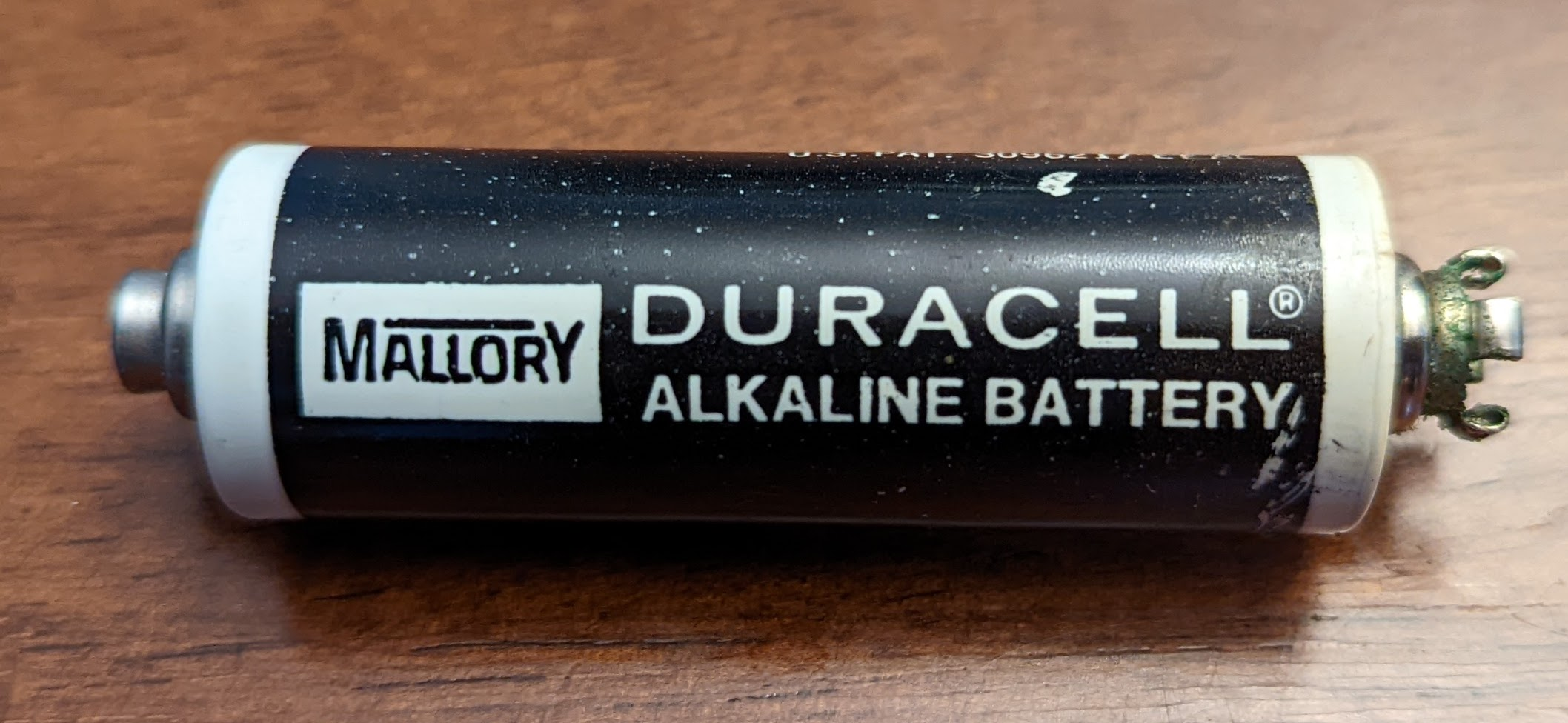
Mallory Duracell Battery from the 1970s

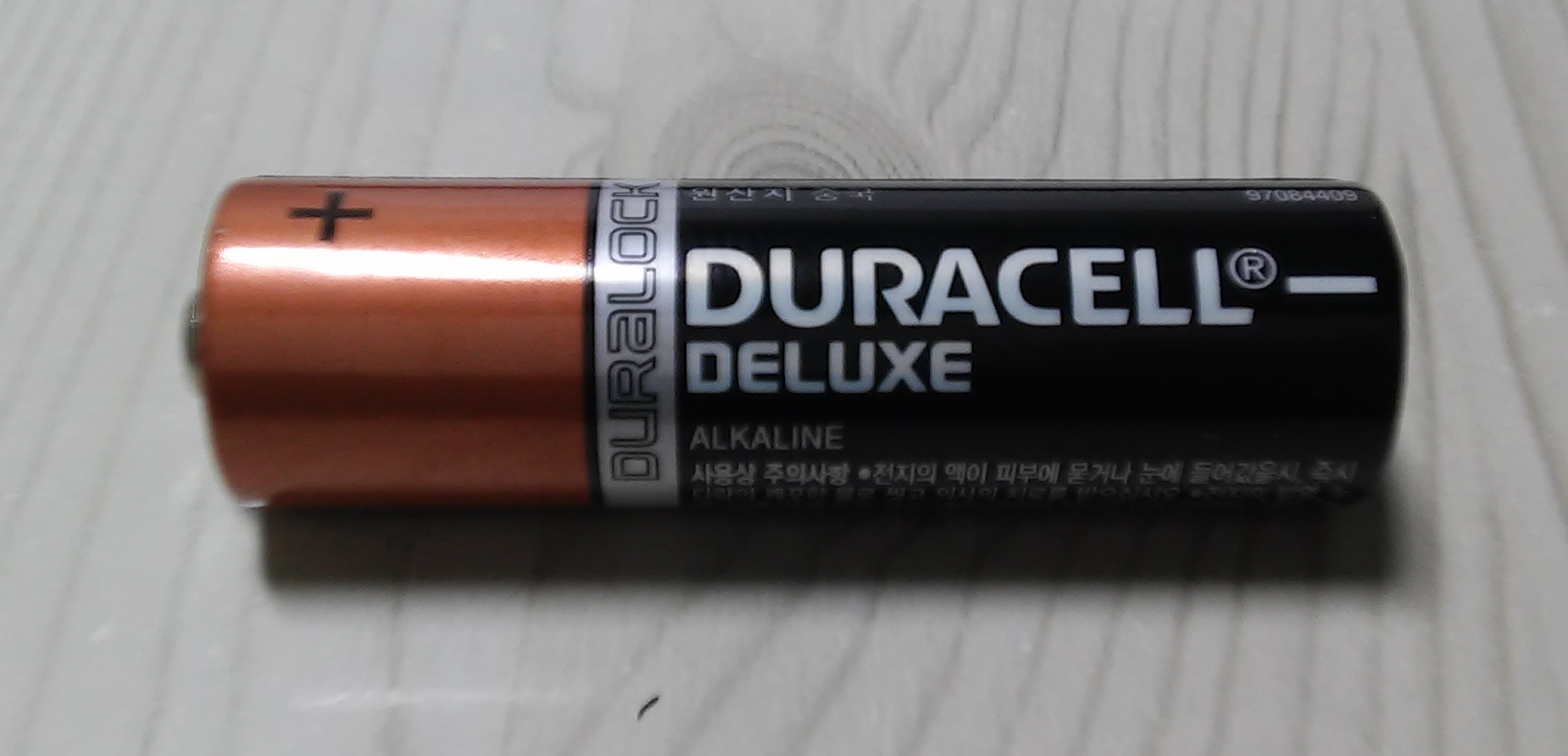
Duracell AA battery

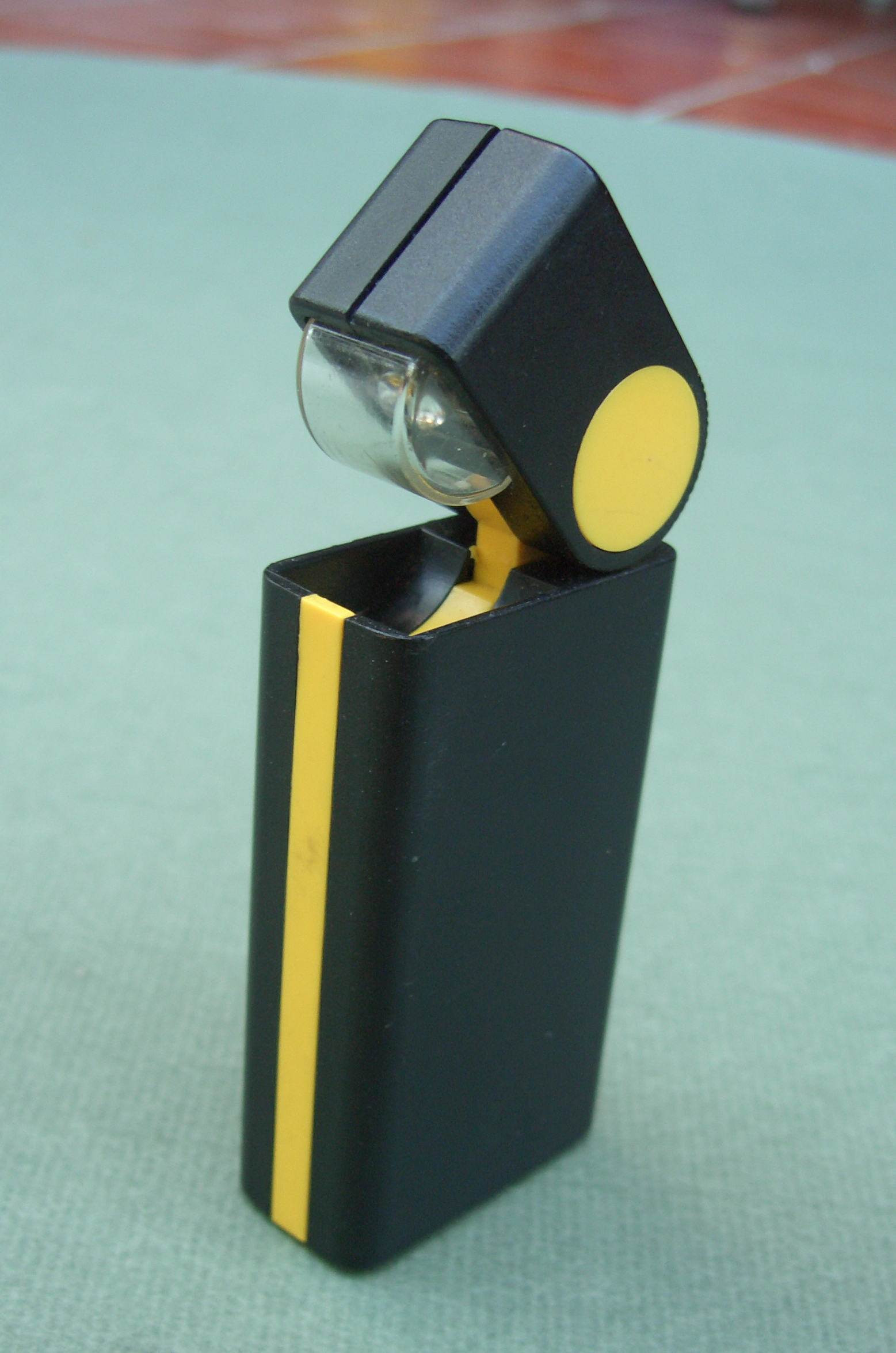
Duracell flashlight from the 1980s

== Sponsorships ==
In February 2022, Duracell announced a long-term partnership deal with Williams Racing. The deal culminated with the vertical air intake of the car designed like a Duracell battery, which was first introduced in the 2022 Miami Grand Prix. The design was later implemented on the Williams FW45 for the 2023 season. Duracell also became the title sponsor of William Racing's eNASCAR team as Duracell Williams Esports eNASCAR. In May 2026, Duracell became the official sponsor for Spanish La Liga for the fourth official boards to indicate additional time at the end of a match, as well as player substitutions starting in the 2026–27 season.

== See also ==
- Duracell Bunny
- The Puttermans
