= Samuel Ruben =

American chemist and battery inventor (1900–1988)

- Born: July 14, 1900; Harrison, New Jersey, U.S.
- Died: July 16, 1988 (aged 88); Milwaukie, Oregon, U.S.
- Occupation: Inventor
- Known for: Contributions to electrochemistry and solid-state technology, founding of Duracell

Samuel Ruben (14 July 1900 – 16 July 1988) was an American inventor who made lasting contributions to electrochemistry and solid-state technology, including the founding of Duracell. He is listed as an inventor in over 200 patents.

== Early life ==
Born in Harrison, New Jersey to a Jewish family, Samuel Ruben got his start in electronics when he became a licensed ham radio operator and built radios with spare parts. He had no college degree, withdrawing from the Polytechnic Institute of Brooklyn after a few years due to stress. Samuel Ruben met professor Bergen Davis of Columbia University who tutored him and allowed him to sit in on some Columbia classes. He later returned as a research student at the Polytechnic Institute of Brooklyn. Ruben received several honorary degrees. He was awarded an honorary Doctor of Science degree from his alma mater Polytechnic Institute of Brooklyn, as well as from Columbia University in the Department of Chemical Engineering and Applied Science where he served as a Senior Staff Associate, and Butler University. He also taught at Harvard as a lecturer in chemistry. He endowed a scholarship for Chemical Engineering at Polytechnic (1968–1972).

== Company history ==
Samuel Ruben established Ruben Laboratories in the early 1920s, when Bergen Davis persuaded Electrochemical's main investor Malcolm Clephane to finance a private laboratory for Ruben in lower Manhattan. Ruben moved himself and the lab to New Rochelle, New York, where he would stay for the next 60 years. Clephane would finance the project for 50% of any future royalties. Throughout his lifetime his work accumulated over 300 patents. Ruben teamed with Philip Mallory to create what would become Duracell International. Ruben developed the mercury button cell in 1942 to replace the zinc-carbon batteries at a request from the Army Signal Corps.

With over 100 inventions credited to him personally, one of the most important was the dry electrolytic aluminium capacitor, the solid-state magnesium/cupric sulfide rectifier (a device that converted regular household electric current for use in radios), the vacuum tube relay, the quick heater vacuum tube, and the concept of a balanced-cell mercury battery.

Ruben worked as a researcher from 1918–1921 for the Electrochemical Products Company. He was awarded the Acheson Award by the Electrochemical Society in 1970.

He died two days after his 88th birthday in Milwaukie, Oregon.

== Books ==
Samuel Ruben published multiple books,

- "Handbook of the Elements" - A unique way he chose to display the elements.
- "Necessity's Children: Memoirs of an Independent Inventor" - An autobiography.
- "The Founders of Electrochemistry"
- "The Electronics of Materials"
- "The Evolution of Electric Batteries in Response to Industrial Needs"

== Awards and honors ==
- Edward Longstreth Medal of the Franklin Institute (1972)
- Columbia University Honorary Doctorate
- Butler University Honorary Doctorate
- Polytechnic Institute Honorary Doctorate(1968)
- Golden Plate Award of the American Academy of Achievement (1966)
- Named Inventor of the Year by George Washington University(1965)
