= Dane-Elec =

Dane-Elec Memory
- Industry: Computer electronics
- Fate: Acquired by Gigastone Corporation in 2013
- Products: Computer chips
- Parent: Gigastone Corporation

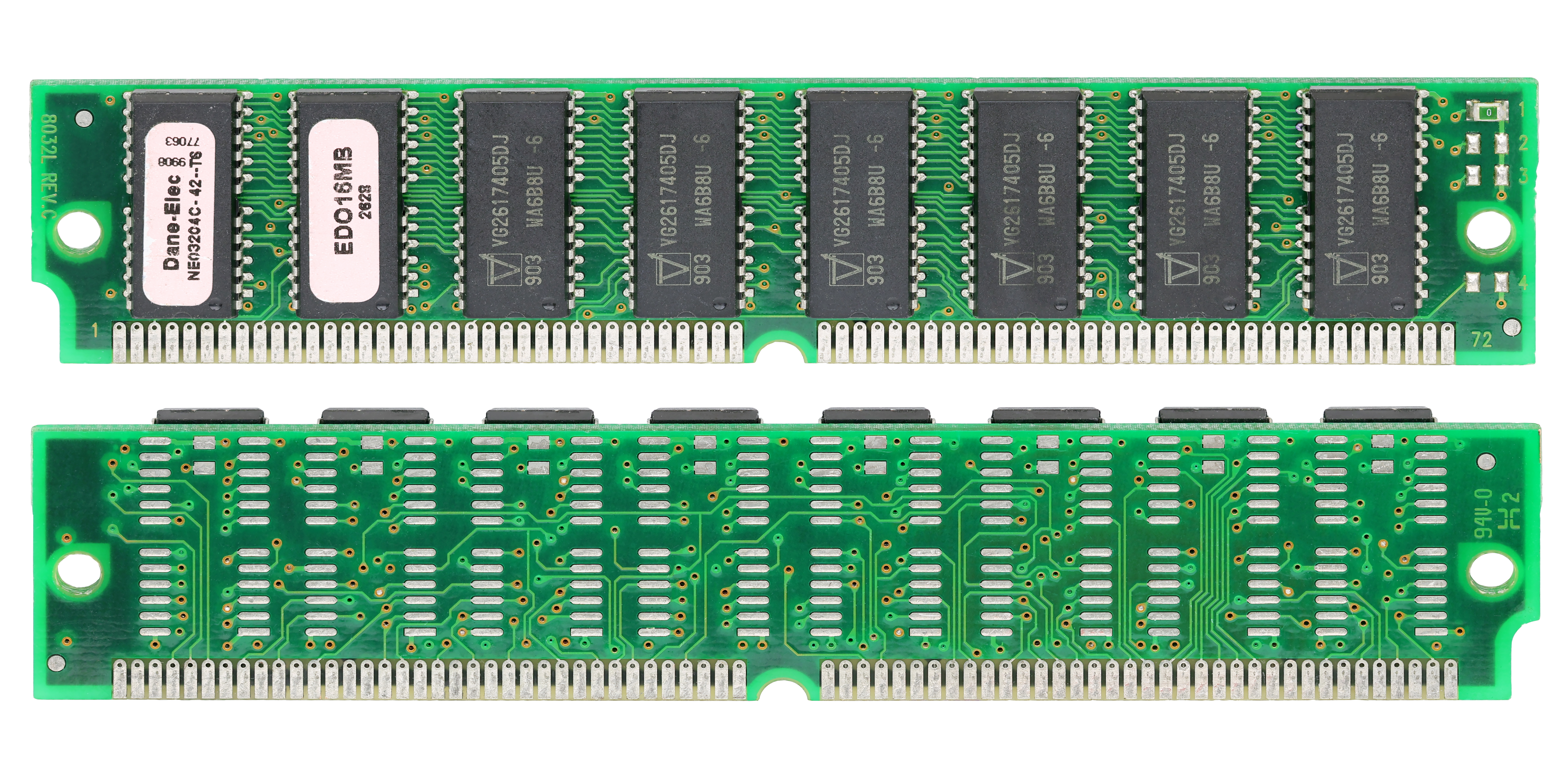
A 16MB 72-pin EDO-RAM memory module from dane-elec

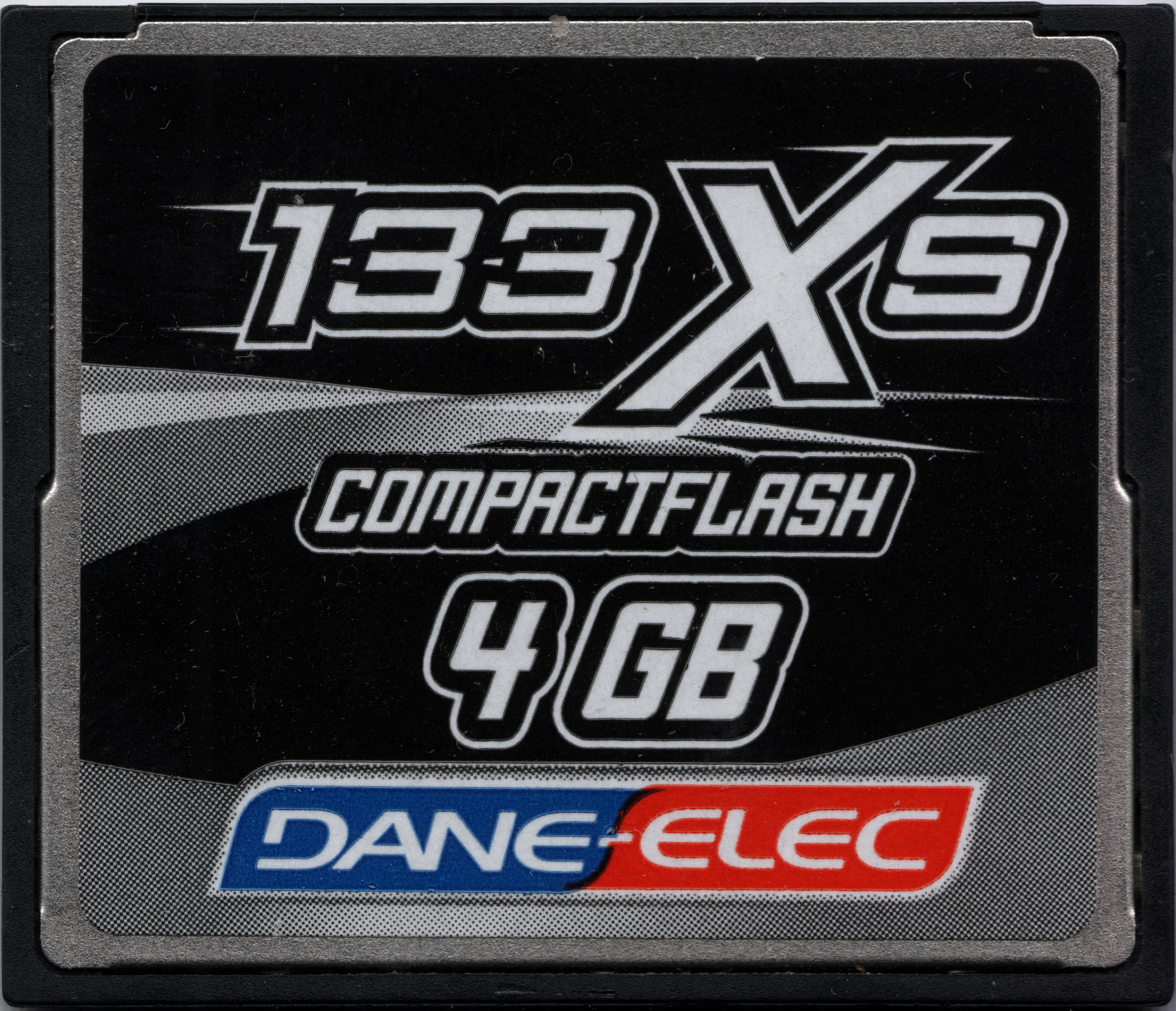
Dane-Elec 4 GB CompactFlash card

Dane-Elec Memory was a European maker and distributor of computer memory chips and storage products. The company was founded by David Haccoun and Nessim Bodokh in 1985.

Activities also included the distribution of modems, computers, printers and workstations. The company had activities in UK, Belgium, Germany, the Netherlands, Denmark, Ireland, Italy, Spain, USA and Israel.

In 2010, the company was acquired (majority stake) by Gigastone Corporation, a Taiwanese manufacturer of flash memory products. Dane-Elec USA still exists as a subsidiary of Gigastone; however, the Dane-Elec brand has been replaced with the Dane brand.

Dane-Elec was quoted on the European stock exchange Euronext from 1999 to 2017.
