= Duracell Bunny =

Rabbit character to advertise batteries

- Duracell Bunny's appearance since 2013
- First appearance: 1973
- Created by: Duracell
- Voiced by: Miles Luna (2019–present)
- Company: Duracell

In-universe information
- Full name: Duracell Bunny
- Species: Rabbit
- Gender: Male
- Affiliation: Mascot

The Duracell Bunny is an anthropomorphic pink rabbit powered by Duracell batteries and trademarked for use in all parts of the world except Turkey, the United States and Canada. Advertisements, which may feature one Duracell Bunny, or several, usually feature the bunnies competing in some way; for example, in a game of football, a drumming competition, or a race. In advertisements, the Duracell Bunny is either a standard battery-powered toy, a stop-motion puppet, or a CGI-animated character.

== History ==
1974 Duracell commercial featuring the pink drumming bunny

Mallory Duracell launched the Duracell Bunny campaign in 1973, with the "Drumming Bunny" television advertisement, created by the Dancer Fitzgerald Sample advertising agency. The ad depicted several pink toy bunnies drumming. By the end of the spot, only one was still running – that being the one powered by a Duracell alkaline battery. The advertisement claimed that Duracell batteries ran several times longer than other batteries, adding as a small footnote that it was being compared to older technology zinc-carbon batteries.

When the Duracell Bunny debuted in North America in 1973, it was slated to be just a one-shot character in the "Drumming Bunny" advertisement. Duracell purportedly trademarked their bunny, but by 1988, that trademark had lapsed. Sensing an opportunity, Duracell's North American rival Energizer created a parody of the "Drumming Bunny" in 1988. Energizer's parody ad began much as Duracell's original 1973 ad did, except that midway through the discussion of which drumming rabbit would last longest, it was interrupted by the Energizer Bunny, a different pink rabbit wearing sunglasses, flip-flops, and beating a bass drum. Energizer created a multi-year campaign around the Energizer Bunny. There are significant differences in appearance between the two companies' mascots – the Energizer Bunny wears sunglasses, has larger ears, is a different shade of pink, and has a different body shape. Also, while the Energizer Bunny is a single rabbit, the Duracell Bunnies are a species. The Duracell Bunny advertising campaign has evolved, and Duracell Bunnies are usually depicted as doing something other than beating a drum as they did in the original 1973 advertisement. In 2019, the bunny spoke for the first time, with its voice being provided by American voice actor and writer Miles Luna.

== Legal issues ==
=== 1990 trademark dispute ===
When Energizer's 1988 parody became an advertising success and Energizer trademarked its bunny, Duracell decided to revive the Duracell Bunny campaign and filed for a new United States trademark of its own, referencing the original use of the character more than a decade earlier. The resulting dispute resulted in a confidential out-of-court settlement on January 10, 1992, whereby Energizer took exclusive trademark rights in the United States and Canada, and Duracell took exclusive rights in all other places in the world.

=== 2016 distribution lawsuit ===
In February 2016, Energizer filed a trademark infringement and contract violation lawsuit against Duracell. Energizer alleged that Duracell was using a pink bunny in its advertising in the United States, did not have any trademark rights in the United States for a pink bunny, and had violated an agreement between Energizer and Duracell governing the use of a pink bunny trademark in the U.S. Duracell replied that the cases Energizer cited came from overseas distributors importing packages from abroad, and that Duracell did not have the specific power to stop those distributors from doing so. In November 2017, a United States District court judge threw out most of Energizer's claims in a summary judgement, but leaving the breach of the 1992 territorial contract dispute active with respect to the two companies' bunny trademarks.
