= Energizer Bunny =

Commercial mascot

- Energizer Bunny's appearance since 2016
- First appearance: 1988
- Company: Energizer

In-universe information
- Species: Rabbit
- Affiliation: Energizer

The Energizer Bunny is the mascot of Energizer batteries in Canada, Mexico, United States, Central America, Puerto Rico, Ecuador and Venezuela. It is a pink mechanical toy rabbit with an Energizer battery wearing sunglasses and blue and black striped flip-flops that beats a bass drum bearing the Energizer logo.

== History ==
The Energizer Bunny's original animatronic appearance as seen in commercials from the 1990s

The Energizer Bunny was first created as a parody of the Duracell Bunny, which first appeared in television advertising in 1973, in its "Drumming Bunny" commercial. Duracell had purportedly trademarked the drumming bunny character, but whether they had or not, said trademark had lapsed by 1988, providing Energizer an opening to create their own trademark.

The first Energizer Bunny commercial was broadcast on United States television in 1988. Produced by DDB Needham Worldwide, the spot began as a direct parody of Duracell's "Drumming Bunny" ad. In the original Duracell ads, a set of battery-powered drum-playing toy rabbits gradually slow to a halt until only the toy powered by a Duracell copper-top battery remains active. In Energizer's parody, the Energizer Bunny enters the screen midway through the ad, beating a huge bass drum and swinging a mallet over his head.

The Energizer Bunny is promoted as being able to continue operating indefinitely, or at least much longer than similar toys (or other products) using rival brands' batteries. The criticism was that Duracell compared their batteries with carbon-zinc batteries, and not similar alkaline batteries like Energizer. The creative team at D.D.B. Chicago who conceived and designed the bunny chose All Effects special effects company to build the original Energizer Bunny, a remote-controlled prop. All Effects operated the Energizer Bunny in most of its first commercials.

In subsequent commercials, the Bunny left the studio in which it had performed the "Drumming Bunny" ad to wander onto the sets of realistic-looking commercials for fictional products, interrupting their action. As the campaign progressed, many of these ads were standalone (for fictional products such as "Sitagin Hemorrhoid Remedy", "Nasotine Sinus Relief", "TresCafe Coffee", "Alarm" deodorant soap, etc.) and even a few featured celebrities, such as Lyle Alzado promoting a snack called "Pigskins", and Ted Nugent doing an ad for a Mexican food chain called "Cucaracha") only to have the Bunny march through, beating his drum, because he was "still going". One infamous commercial was for a fictional long-distance telephone company with a couple in the United Kingdom talking to their son, who was supposedly in New York and exclaimed that he "sounded like he's right next door", and when the Bunny came in, he knocked down the divider to show they really were next to each other. Eventually real-life products and icons would do a crossover with the Energizer Bunny (Michael J. Fox doing a Pepsi ad, and the opening of TV shows such as Alfred Hitchcock Presents and ABC's Wide World of Sports). The Energizer Bunny has appeared in more than 115 television commercials. In these commercials, a voice-over would announce one of various slogans used throughout the years; all of them would relate the stalwartness of the Energizer Bunny to the long-lasting power of their batteries. The original slogan boasted that "...[n]othing outlasts the Energizer...", but it was eventually changed after a lawsuit filed by Duracell disputing Energizer's claim. Those commercials with the bunny interrupting all the action in a commercial were eventually spoofed in the 1993 film Hot Shots! Part Deux, featuring a blue animal drumming through instead of the pink bunny. The two people fighting then use their guns to shoot the animal, which explodes.

=== 1990s ===
In the 1990s advertisements featuring the Energizer Bunny were made by a variety of companies, including Industrial Light & Magic, Cafe FX and Method Studios. Eric Allard's All Effects Company however did the bulk of the live action Energizer Bunny building, maintenance and puppeteering with ILM taking over for later commercials.

From 1993 to 1995, Energizer ran a series of commercials featuring a fictional rival battery called "Supervolt" including a Supervolt which was an obvious lookalike of Duracell. At this time, the position of the Energizer battery moved from Energizer Bunny's leg to its back. As Supervolt's battery sales had fallen and their attempts to perfect the Supervolt weasel has been failing, Supervolt's CEO (portrayed by Rip Torn) sought to neutralize the Energizer Bunny by targeting its battery. Supervolt's CEO sought out people who could help him:

- The first ad starred a Blofeld-like evil genius (portrayed by Joss Ackland) who planned to use the Matter Disintegrator to destroy the battery. It shut down when the Supervolt batteries in it ran out.
- The second ad starred King Kong where Supervolt's CEO gave him a reward card (for bananas). When cornering the Energizer Bunny on the Empire State Building, a woman who King Kong angered slammed a window down on his foot, causing him to fall off the Empire State Building.

In many of the associated commercials that followed, villains such as Darth Vader, the Wicked Witch of the West, Count Dracula, Wile E. Coyote, Boris and Natasha, as well as a robotic flea, would try to destroy or capture the Bunny only to see complications arise when their devices using Supervolt batteries ran out or other circumstances allowed for the bunny's escape. In addition, a flock of vultures and a foxhunt would get exhausted trying to catch the Energizer Bunny and the Grim Reaper gave up waiting for the Energizer Bunny to come with him.

The "Blofeld" ad showed the quality of the product being advertised when it created complications for the villain – so as not to imply that Energizer was better than any other brand, as well as to encourage people to buy Energizer batteries for their smoke detectors.

=== 2016 ===
In September 2016, Energizer switched their advertising agency to Camp+King and introduced a new more expressive bunny who is slimmer and has more facial expression. The bunny will keep the signature drum, flip flops, and dark sunglasses, but the pink fur will be more realistic.

== Campaign success ==
Despite the immense popularity of the campaign, sales of Energizer batteries actually went down during the years that the ads ran. Duracell claimed that 40 percent of its customers thought the campaign was promoting Duracell, not Energizer, but provided no evidence. Speculation has it that TV watchers still associated pink bunnies with Duracell, so the Energizer ads were actually helping their competitor's sales rather than their own.

== In popular culture ==
In North America the term "Energizer Bunny" has entered the vernacular as a term for anything that continues endlessly, or someone that has immense stamina. In Europe and Australia the term "Duracell Bunny" has a similar connotation. Several U.S. presidential candidates have compared themselves to the bunny, including President George H. W. Bush in 1992 and Howard Dean in 2004.

In 1992, the company PC Dynamics created a Screen Saver for Windows 3.x featuring Energizer Bunny with audio clips from the commercials.

Energizer was the corporate sponsor of Star Tours at Disneyland Park and Disney's Hollywood Studios for several years; the bunny appeared in several ride-themed advertisements around the show's exit. The promotional poster along the exit ramp for Star Tours is one of the few appearances that shows the battery on his back.

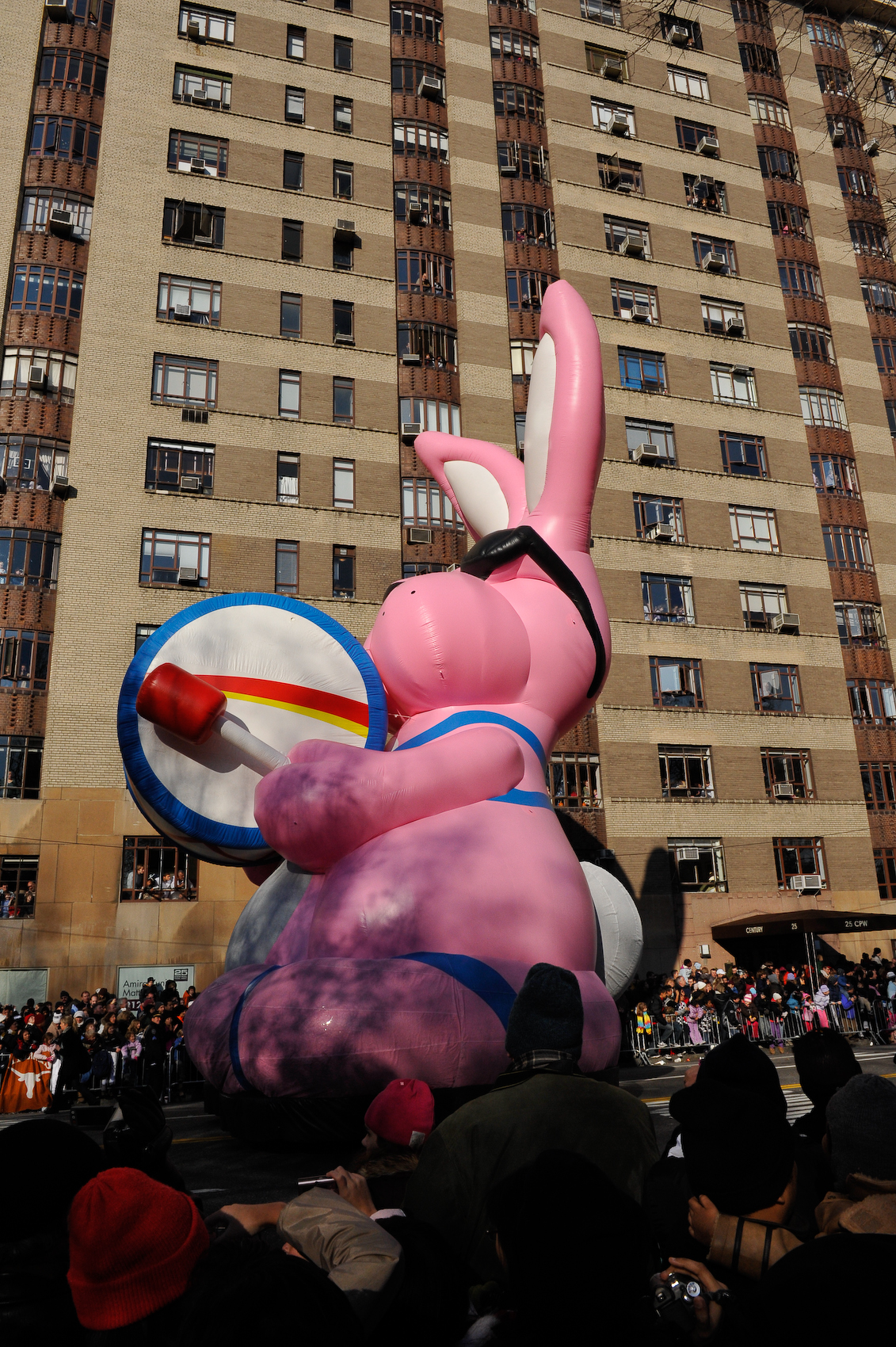
The Energizer Bunny, as it appears in the Macy's Thanksgiving Day Parade in 2008

In 2006, an Energizer Bunny balloonicle debuted in the Macy's Thanksgiving Day Parade and appeared until 2011.

On October 31, 2007, TY released an Energizer Bunny Beanie Baby as a Walgreens Exclusive with a birthday of November 23, 2007. The poem on the tag reads:

Whether at home, at work or play
Nothing will get in E.B.'s way
And here's one thing that's sure worth knowing
This bunny just keeps going and going!

== Legal challenges ==
=== 1990 Duracell trademark dispute ===
When Energizer's 1988 parody became an advertising success and Energizer trademarked its bunny, Duracell decided to revive the Duracell Bunny campaign and filed for a new United States trademark of its own, citing the original use of the character more than a decade earlier. The dispute resulted in a confidential January 10, 1992 out of court settlement, where Energizer (and its bunny) took exclusive trademark rights in the United States and Canada, and Duracell (and its bunny) took exclusive rights in all other places in the world, which caused the Energizer Bunny to be phased out in most countries. The Energizer Bunny was succeeded by Mr. Energizer, an anthropomorphic battery who appeared in stop motion advertisements voiced by Carlos Alazraqui. In certain Latin American countries that kept the Energizer Bunny after 1992 and did not replace the character with Mr. Energizer, it coexists with Duracell Bunny.

=== 1991 Adolph Coors lawsuit ===
In 1991, Energizer Holdings unsuccessfully sued the Adolph Coors Company for copyright and trademark infringement for creating a parody of its Energizer bunny ads.

The advertisement had comedian Leslie Nielsen banging a bass drum while wearing rabbit ears while the announcer said "It keeps growing and growing!" The court eventually sided with Coors noting the obvious facts that the content of the ad is substantially different considering Nielsen was not a toy and he did not run on batteries.

=== 2016 Duracell distribution lawsuit ===
In February 2016, Energizer filed a trademark infringement and contract violation lawsuit against Duracell. Energizer alleged that Duracell was using a pink bunny in its advertising in the United States, did not have any trademark rights in the United States in a pink bunny, and had violated an agreement between Energizer and Duracell governing the use of a pink bunny trademark in the U.S. Duracell replied that the cases Energizer cited came from overseas distributors importing packages from abroad, and that Duracell did not have the specific power to stop those distributors from doing so. In November 2017, a United States District court judge threw out most of Energizer's claims in a summary judgement, but leaving the breach of the 1992 territorial contract dispute active with respect to the two companies' bunny trademarks.
