= Button cell =

Small battery

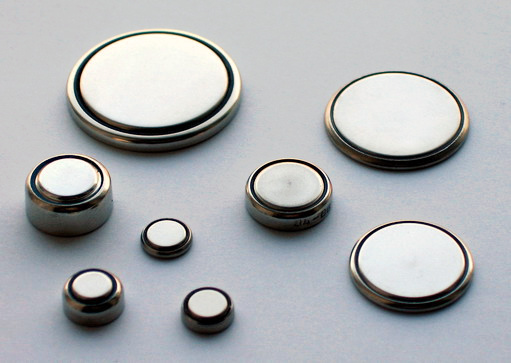
Button, coin, or watch cells

A button cell, watch battery, or coin battery is a small battery made of a single electrochemical cell and shaped as a squat cylinder typically 5 to 25 mm (0.197 to 0.984 in) in diameter and 1 to 6 mm (0.039 to 0.236 in) high – resembling a button. Stainless steel usually forms the bottom body and positive terminal of the cell; insulated from it, the metallic top cap forms the negative terminal.

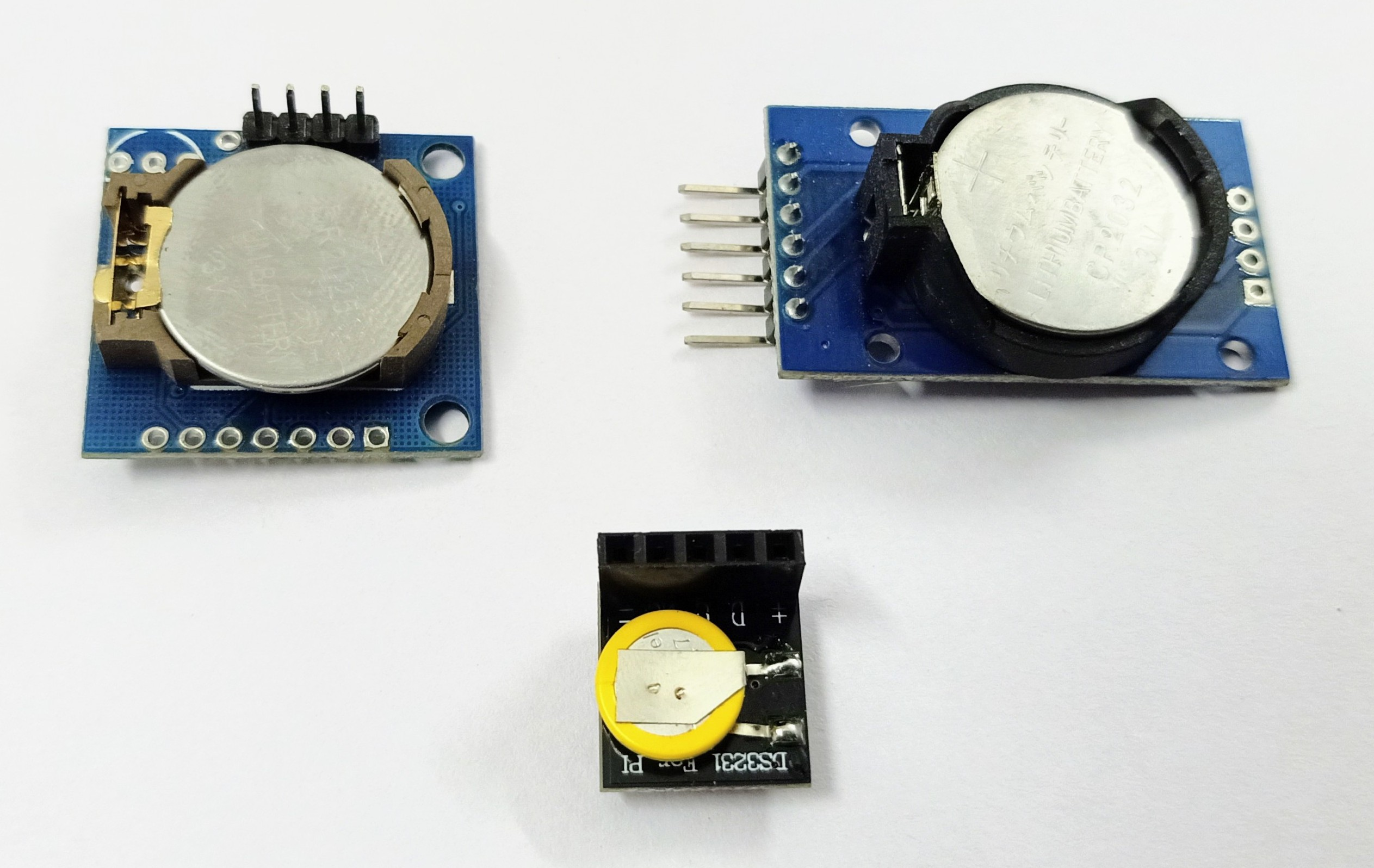
Button cell use in RTC modules as power source

Button cells are used to power small portable electronic devices such as wrist watches, pocket calculators, and remote key fobs. Wider variants are usually called coin cells. Devices using button cells are usually designed around a cell giving a long service life, typically well over a year in continuous use in a wristwatch. Most button cells have low self-discharge, holding their charge for a long time if not used.

Button cells are usually disposable primary cells, but some are rechargeable secondary cells. Common chemistries include zinc, lithium, manganese dioxide, and silver oxide. Mercuric oxide button cells were formerly common, but are no longer available due to the toxicity and environmental effects of mercury.

Button cells are dangerous for small children, as when swallowed they can cause severe internal burns and significant injury or death. Duracell has attempted to mitigate this by adding a bitter coating to their batteries.

== Properties of cell chemistries ==
Cells of different chemical composition made in the same size are mechanically interchangeable. However, the composition can affect service life and voltage stability. Using the wrong cell may lead to short life or improper operation (for example, light metering on a camera requires a stable voltage, thus silver cells are usually specified). Sometimes different cells of the same type, size and capacity are optimized for different loads by using different electrolytes, so that one may have longer service life than the other when supplying a relatively high current.

Alkaline batteries are made in the same button sizes as the other types, but typically provide less capacity and less stable voltage than more costly silver oxide or lithium cells.

Silver cells may have an output voltage that is stable until it suddenly drops at end of life. This varies for individual types; one manufacturer (Energizer) offers three silver oxide cells of the same size, 357–303, 357-303H and EPX76, with capacities ranging from 150 to 200 mAh, voltage characteristics ranging from gradually reducing to fairly constant, and some stated to be for continuous low drain with high pulse on demand, others for photo use.

Mercury batteries also supply a stable voltage, but are banned in many countries due to their toxicity and environmental impact.

Zinc-air batteries use air as the depolarizer and have much higher capacity than other types, as they take that air from the atmosphere. Cells have an air-tight seal which must be removed before use; they will then dry out in a few weeks, regardless of use.

For comparison, the properties of some cells from one manufacturer with diameter 11.6 mm and height 5.4 mm were listed in 2009 as:

- Silver: capacity 200 mAh to an end-point of 0.9 V, internal resistance 5–15 Ω, weight 2.3 g
- Alkaline (manganese dioxide): 150 mAh (0.9), 3–9 Ω, 2.4 g
- Mercury: 200 mAh, 2.6 g
- Zinc-air: 620 mAh, 1.9 g

Examining datasheets for a manufacturer's range may show a high-capacity alkaline cell with a capacity as high as one of the lower-capacity silver types; or a particular silver cell with twice the capacity of a particular alkaline cell. If the powered equipment requires a relatively high voltage (e.g., 1.3 V) to operate correctly, a silver cell with a flat discharge characteristic will give much longer service than an alkaline cell—even if it has the same specified capacity in mAh to an end-point of 0.9 V. If a device seems to "eat up" batteries after the original supplied by the manufacturer is replaced, it may be useful to check the device's requirements and the replacement battery's characteristics. For digital calipers, in particular, some are specified to require at least 1.25 V to operate and others 1.38 V.

While alkaline, silver oxide, and mercury batteries of the same size may be mechanically interchangeable in any given device, use of a cell of the right voltage but unsuitable characteristics can lead to short battery life or failure to operate equipment. Common lithium primary cells, with a terminal voltage around 3 volts, are not made in sizes interchangeable with 1.5 volt cells. Use of a battery of significantly higher voltage than equipment is designed for can cause permanent damage.

== Type designation ==
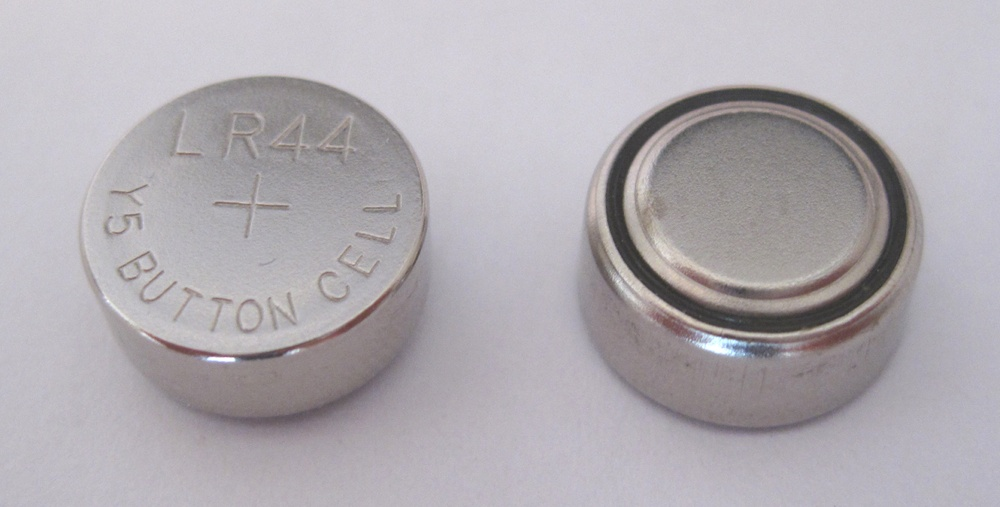
LR44 alkaline cell

International standard IEC 60086-3 defines an alphanumeric coding system for "Watch batteries". Manufacturers often have their own naming system; for example, the cell called LR1154 by the IEC standard is named AG13, LR44, 357, A76, and other names by different manufacturers. The IEC standard and some others encode the case size so that the numeric part of the code is uniquely determined by the case size; other codes do not encode size directly.

Examples of batteries conforming to the IEC standard are CR2032, SR516, and LR1154, where the letters and numbers indicate the following characteristics.

=== Electrochemical system ===
The first letter in the IEC standard system identifies the chemical composition of the battery, which also implies a nominal voltage:

Letter code	Common name	Positive electrode	Electrolyte	Negative electrode	Nominal voltage (V)	End-point voltage (V)	Maximum voltage (V)	Comments
–	Zinc-carbon	Manganese dioxide	Zinc chloride	Zinc	1.5	?	1.72	
L	Alkaline	Manganese dioxide	Alkali	Zinc	1.5	1.0	1.65	Much higher capacity than zinc-carbon.
S	Silver	Silver oxide	Alkali	Zinc	1.55	1.2	1.63	SR synonymous to AG. Much flatter discharge curve than L. Slightly higher nominal capacity, much higher effective capacity for devices with higher cutoff voltage (eg. digital calipers).
P	Zinc-air	Oxygen	Alkali	Zinc	1.4	1.2	1.68	High capacity. Activated by removing seal from vent. Electrolyte can dry out.
C	Lithium	Manganese dioxide	Organic	Lithium	3	2.0	3.7	Very common. Gradual loss of voltage with discharge.
B		Carbon monofluoride	Organic	Lithium	3	2.0	3.7	Similar to C, with better performance and lower self-discharge at higher temperatures; lower initial voltage, flatter discharge curve.
G		Copper oxide	Organic	Lithium	1.5	1.2	2.3	
Z	Nickel oxyhydroxide	Manganese dioxide, nickel oxyhydroxide	Alkali	Zinc	1.5	?		
E	Thionyl chloride	Thionyl chloride	Organic	Lithium	3.6	?	3.9	
F	Iron sulfide	Iron disulfide	Organic	Lithium	1.5	?	1.83	Low temperature, high capacity
M, N (withdrawn)	Mercury	Mercuric oxide	Alkali	Zinc	1.35/1.40	1.1	?	

For types with stable voltage falling precipitously at end-of-life (cliff-top voltage-versus-time graph), the end-voltage is the value at the "cliff-edge", after which the voltage drops extremely rapidly. For types which lose voltage gradually (slope graph, no cliff-edge), the end-point is the voltage beyond which further discharge will cause damage to the battery and possibly the device it is powering, typically 1.0 or 0.9 V.

Common names are conventional rather than uniquely descriptive; for example, a silver (oxide) cell has an alkaline electrolyte.

L, S, and C type cells are today the most commonly used types in quartz watches, calculators, small PDA devices, computer clocks, and blinky lights. Miniature zinc-air batteries – P type – are used in hearing aids and medical instruments. In the IEC system, larger cells may have no prefix for the chemical system, indicating they are zinc-carbon batteries; such types are not available in button cell format.

The second letter, R, indicates a round (cylindrical) form.

The standard only describes primary batteries. Rechargeable types made in the same case size will carry a different prefix not given in the IEC standard, for example some ML and LiR button cells use rechargeable lithium technology.

For rechargeables, the IEC prefixes are:

- H - alloy-nickel oxide with aqueous electrolyte, 1.2V
- K - cadmium-nickel oxide with aqueous electrolyte, 1.2V
- PB - lead-lead dioxide with sulfuric acid electrolyte, 2V
- IC - lithium-cobalt oxide with organic electrolyte, 3.8V
- IN - lithium-nickel oxide with organic electrolyte, 3.8V
- IM - lithium-manganese oxide with organic electrolyte, 3.8V

Prefix	Rechargeable	Chemistry	Nominal voltage (V)	Comments
LPM, LiR, RJD, RCR	yes	Li-ion	3.7	sometimes called "rechargeable CR"; higher voltage than CR can cause damage when used as direct replacement, may be lowered with a serial diode or regulator
ML	yes	LiMnO2	3	"manganese"; -20..+60 °C, 2.8..3.2V charging; common for long-term memory/RTC backups; plateaus at 2.5V
MS	yes	LiMnSi	3	"manganese silicon"; -20..+60 °C, 2.8..3.3V charging; better charge/discharge characteristics than VL or ML; common for memory/RTC backups
VL	yes	LiV2O5	3	"vanadium", eg, VL1220, VL2020, VL2330, VL3032; -20..+60 °C, 3.25..3.55V charging; lower voltage drop on load
CTL	yes	CoTiLi	2.3	"cobalt titanium"; -20..+60 °C, 2.5..2.7V charging; common in solar watches, sometimes called "watch capacitor"
MT	yes	LiMnTi	1.5	"manganese titanium"; -10..+60 °C, 1.8..2.6V charging
V, MH	yes	NiMH	1.2	can replace LR/SR cells if lower voltage than 1.5V is not a problem
TL	no	LiSoCl2	3.6	"thionyl chloride"; for low temperatures

=== Package size ===
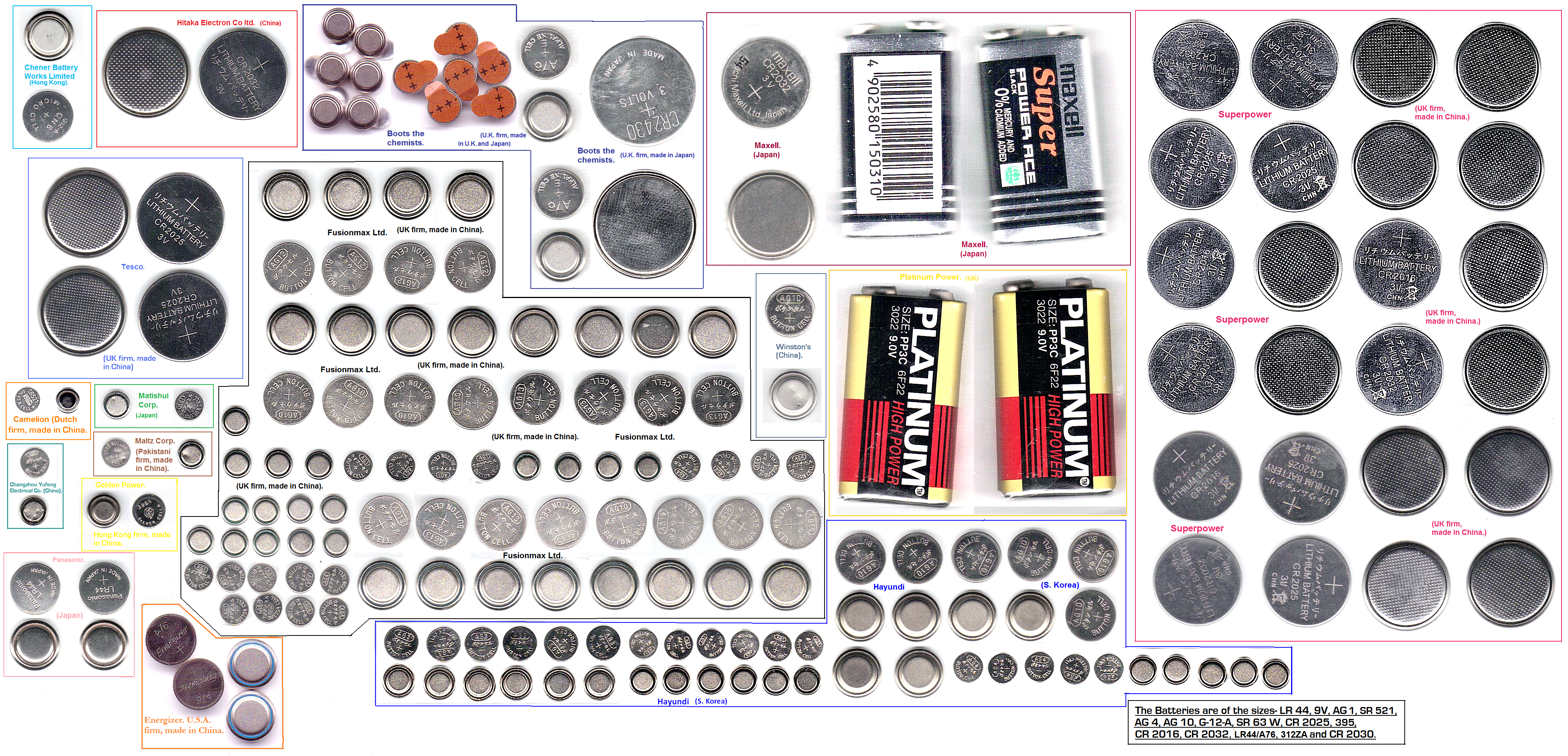
Several sizes of button and coin cell with four 9 V batteries as a size comparison

The package size of button batteries can be indicated by a 2-digit code representing a standard case size, or a 3- or 4-digit code representing the cell diameter and height, where the first one or two digits encode the outer diameter of the battery in whole millimeters, rounded down. Exact diameters are specified by the standard, and there is no ambiguity; e.g., any cell with an initial 9 is 9.5 mm in diameter, since no other value between 9.0 and 9.9 is used. The last two digits are the overall height in tenths of a millimeter.

Diameter code (first 1 or 2 digits)
Number code	Nominal diameter (mm)	Tolerance (mm)
4	4.8	±0.15
5	5.8	±0.15
6	6.8	±0.15
7	7.9	±0.15
9	9.5	±0.15
10	10.0	±0.20
11	11.6	±0.20
12	12.5	±0.25
16	16.0	±0.25
20	20.0	±0.25
23	23.0	±0.50
24	24.5	±0.50
44	11.6	±0.20

Examples:

- CR2032: lithium, 20 mm diameter, 3.2 mm height, 220 mAh
- CR2032H; lithium, 20 mm diameter, 3.2 mm height 240 mAh
- CR2025: lithium, 20 mm diameter, 2.5 mm height, 170 mAh
- SR516: silver, 5.8 mm diameter, 1.6 mm height
- LR1154/SR1154: alkaline/silver, 11.6 mm diameter, 5.4 mm height. The two-digit codes LR44/SR44 are often used for this size

Some coin cells, particularly lithium, are made with solder tabs for permanent installation, such as to power memory for configuration information of a device. The complete nomenclature will have prefixes and suffixes to indicate special terminal arrangements. For example, there is a plug-in and a solder-in CR2032, a plug-in and three solder-in BR2330s in addition to CR2330s, and many rechargeables in 2032, 2330, and other sizes.

=== Letter suffix ===
After the package code, the following additional letters may optionally appear in the type designation to indicate the electrolyte used:

- P: potassium hydroxide electrolyte
- S: sodium hydroxide electrolyte
- No letter: organic electrolyte
- SW: low drain type for quartz watches (analog or digital) without light, alarm, or chronograph functions
- W: high drain type for all quartz watches, calculators and cameras. The battery complies with all the requirements of the international IEC 60086-3 standard for watch batteries.

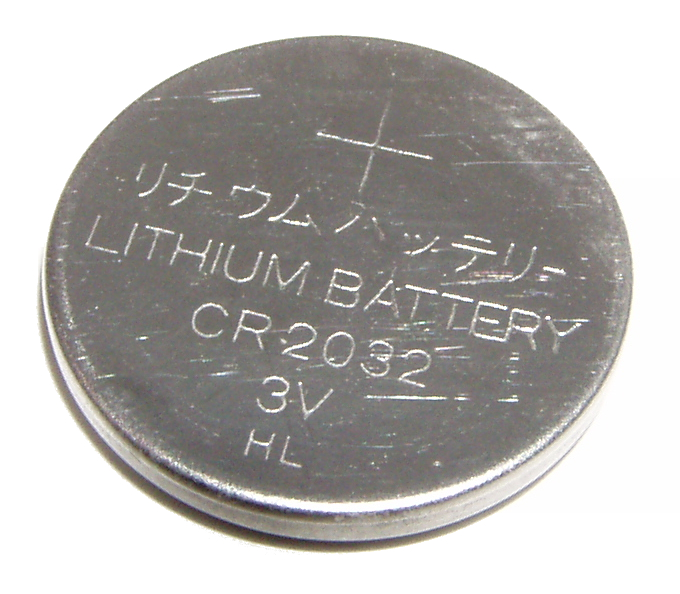
Type CR2032 watch battery (lithium anode, 3 V, 20.0 mm × 3.2 mm)

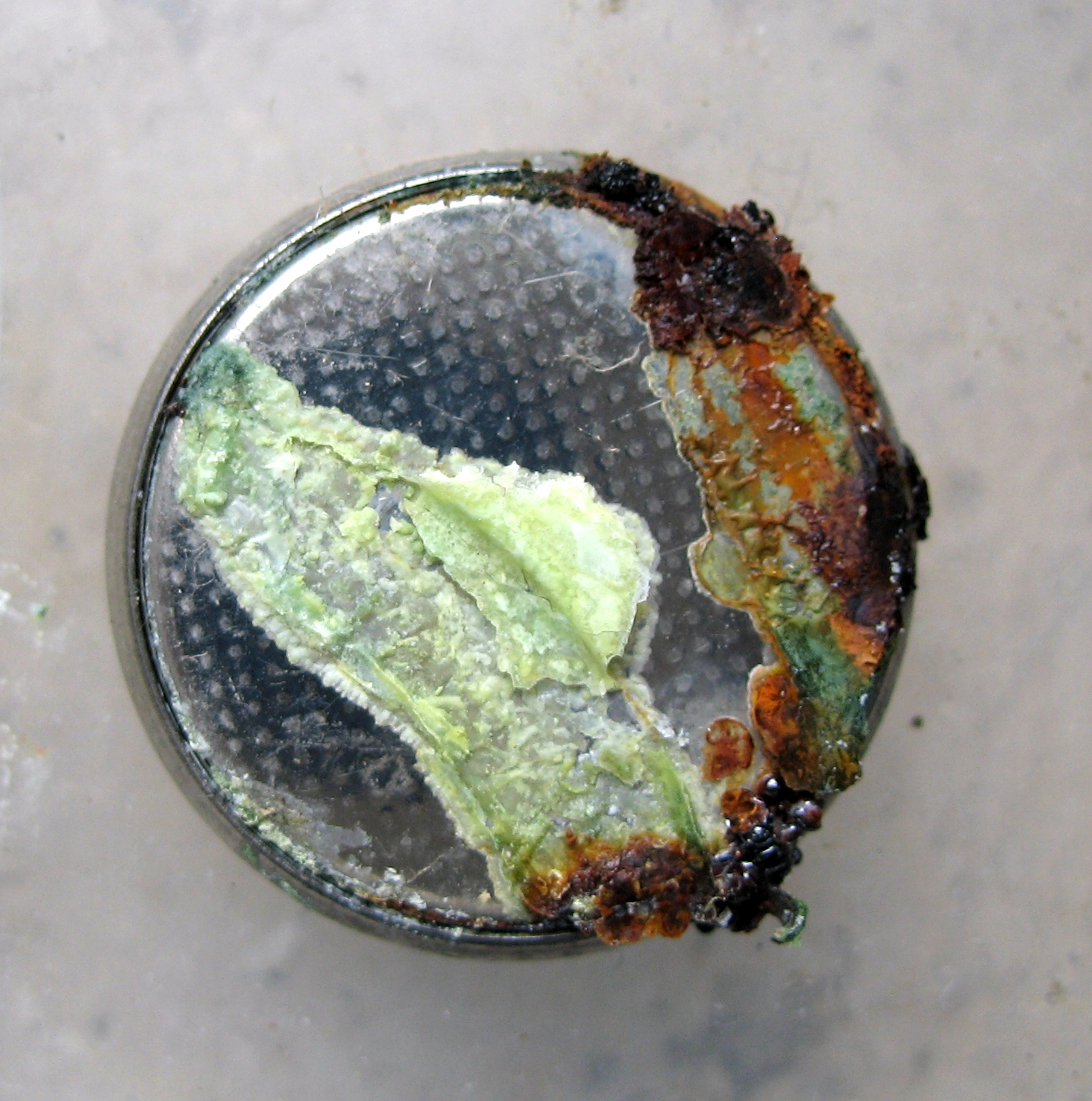
Leaked and corroded button cell

=== Other package markings ===
Apart from the type code described in the preceding section, watch batteries should also be marked with

- the name or trademark of the manufacturer or supplier;
- the polarity (+);
- the date of manufacturing.

==== Date codes ====
Often a 2-letter code (sometimes on the side of the battery) where the first letter identifies the manufacturer and the second is the year of manufacture. For example:

- YN – the letter N is the 14th letter in the alphabet – indicates the cell was manufactured in 2014.

There is no universal standard.

The manufacturing date can be abbreviated to the last digit of the year, followed by a digit or letter indicating the month, where O, Y, and Z are used for October, November and December, respectively (e.g., 01 = January 2010 or 2000, 9Y = November 2019 or 2009).

=== Common manufacturer code ===
A code used by some manufacturers is AG (alkaline) or SG (silver) followed by a number, as follows

G code	IEC code
xG0	521
xG1	621
xG2	726
xG3	736
xG4	626
xG5	754
xG6	920 or 921
xG7	926 or 927
xG8	1120 or 1121
xG9	936
xG10	1130 or 1131
xG11	721
xG12	1142
xG13	1154

To those familiar with the chemical symbol for silver, Ag, this may suggest incorrectly that AG cells are silver.

== Rechargeable variants ==
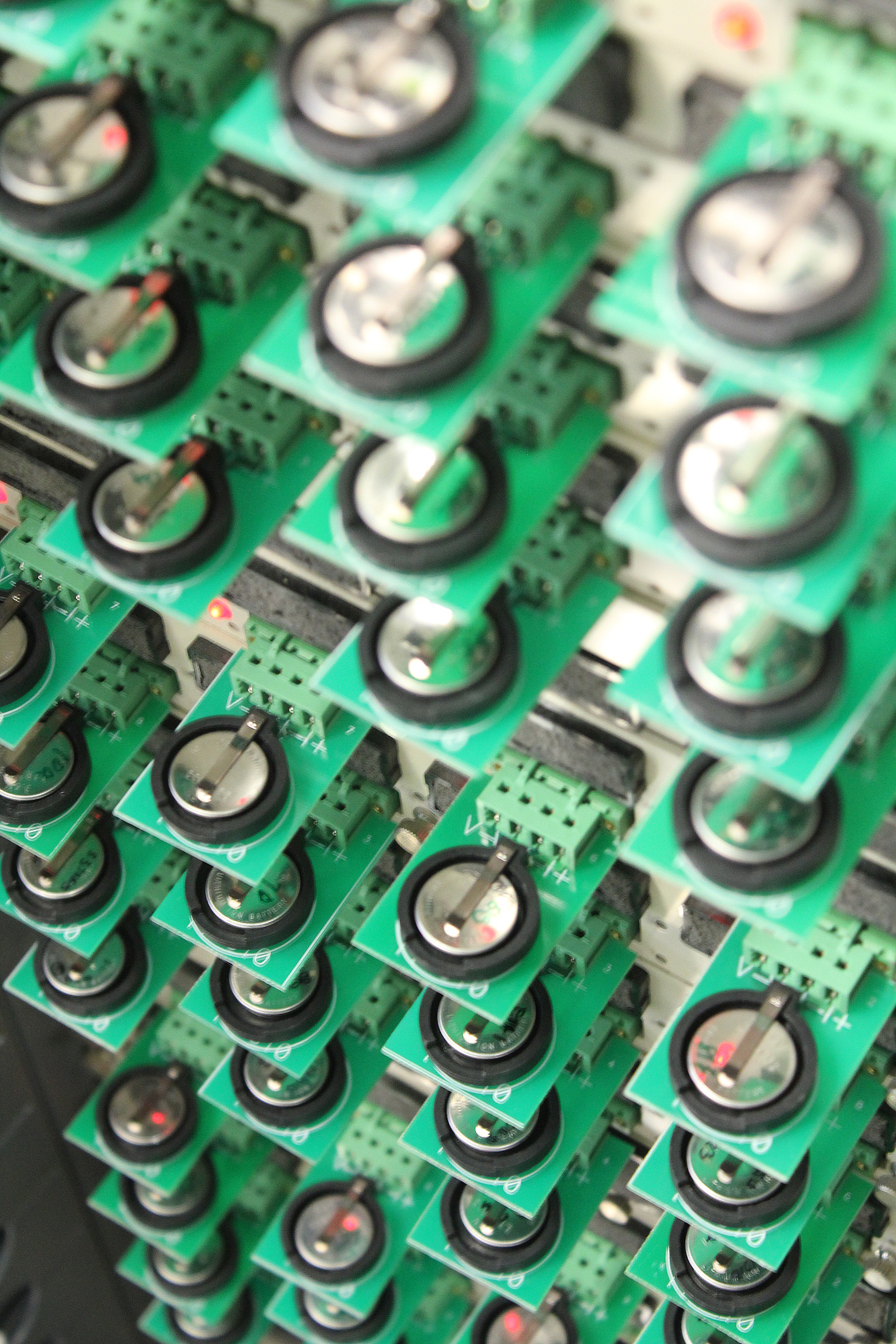
Coin cells being tested

In addition to disposable (single use) button cells, rechargeable batteries in many of the same sizes are available, with lower capacity than disposable cells. Disposable and rechargeable batteries are manufactured to fit into a holder or with solder tags for permanent connection. In equipment with a battery holder, disposable or rechargeable batteries may be used, if the voltage is compatible.

A typical use for a small rechargeable battery (in coin or other format) is to back up the settings of equipment which is normally permanently mains-powered, in the case of power failure. For example, many central heating controllers store operation times and similar information in volatile memory, lost in the case of power failure. It is usual for such systems to include a backup battery, either a disposable in a holder (current drain is extremely low and life is long) or a soldered-in rechargeable.

Rechargeable NiCd button cells were often components of the backup battery of older computers; non-rechargeable lithium button cells with a lifetime of several years are used in later equipment.

Rechargeable batteries typically have the same dimension-based numeric code with different letters; thus CR2032 is a disposable battery while ML2032, VL2032 and LIR2032 are rechargeables that fit in the same holder if not fitted with solder tags. It is mechanically possible, though hazardous, to fit a disposable battery in a holder intended for a rechargeable; holders are fitted in parts of equipment only accessible by service personnel in such cases.

== Health issues ==
=== Accidental ingestion ===
KEEP OUT OF REACH OF CHILDREN icon required by IEC 60086-4

Button cells are attractive to small children; they may put them in their mouth and swallow them. The ingested battery can cause significant damage to internal organs. The battery reacts with bodily fluids, such as mucus or saliva, creating a circuit which can release an alkali that is strong enough to burn through human tissue.

Swallowed batteries can cause damage to the lining of the esophagus, and can create a hole in the esophagus lining in two hours. In severe cases, damage can cause a passage between the esophagus and the trachea. Swallowed button cells can damage the vocal cords. They can even burn through the blood vessels in the chest area, including the aorta. In the United States, 44 child deaths were reported from button battery ingestion in 2002–2021. Ingestions are treated initially with honey or sucralfate as a temporizing measure, with endoscopic removal as definitive treatment.

In Greater Manchester, England, with a population of 2,700,000, two children between 12 months and six years old died, and five suffered life-changing injuries, in the 18 months leading up to October 2014. In the United States, on average, over 3,000 pediatric ingestions of button batteries are reported annually. The proportion of major and fatal outcomes is increasing. Coin cells of diameter 20 mm or greater cause the most serious injuries, even if expended and intact. In Auckland, New Zealand as of 2018 there are about 20 cases per year requiring hospitalization.

In 2020, Duracell announced that they were coating some of their lithium button cells with a bitterant compound to discourage children from ingesting them. An alternative solution is to design (or litigate) the offending cells, mostly 20mm lithium cells, out of the supply chain.

Children most at risk of button battery ingestion are those aged 5 years and under. Three child deaths in Australia reveal that in each case: i) the ingestion was not witnessed, ii) the source of the battery remains unknown, iii) initial misdiagnosis delayed appropriate intervention, iv) diagnosis was confirmed by X-ray, v) in each case the battery lodged in the child's oesophagus, vi) the offending batteries were 20mm lithium cells, vii) death occurred 19 days to 3 weeks after ingestion. The presenting symptoms of button cell ingestion may be misdiagnosed and attributed to common non life-threatening childhood maladies.

=== Mercury and cadmium ===
Some button cells contain mercury or cadmium, which are toxic. In early 2013 the European Parliament Environment Committee voted for a ban on the export and import of a range of mercury-containing products such as button cells and other batteries, to be imposed from 2020.

== See also ==
- List of battery sizes
- List of battery types
- Battery recycling
- Pacemaker
- Implantable cardioverter-defibrillator

== Sources ==
- IEC 60086-3: Primary batteries – Part 3: Watch batteries. International Electrotechnical Commission, Geneva, 1995. (also: BS EN 60086-3:1996)
- Example of a data sheet available from Energizer: "Product datasheet: Energizer CR2032" (PDF). energizer.com. Archived from the original (PDF) on 6 October 2024 – via Internet Archive.
- "An Investigation of Alternatives to Miniature Batteries Containing Mercury" (PDF).
