= Pentax K110D =

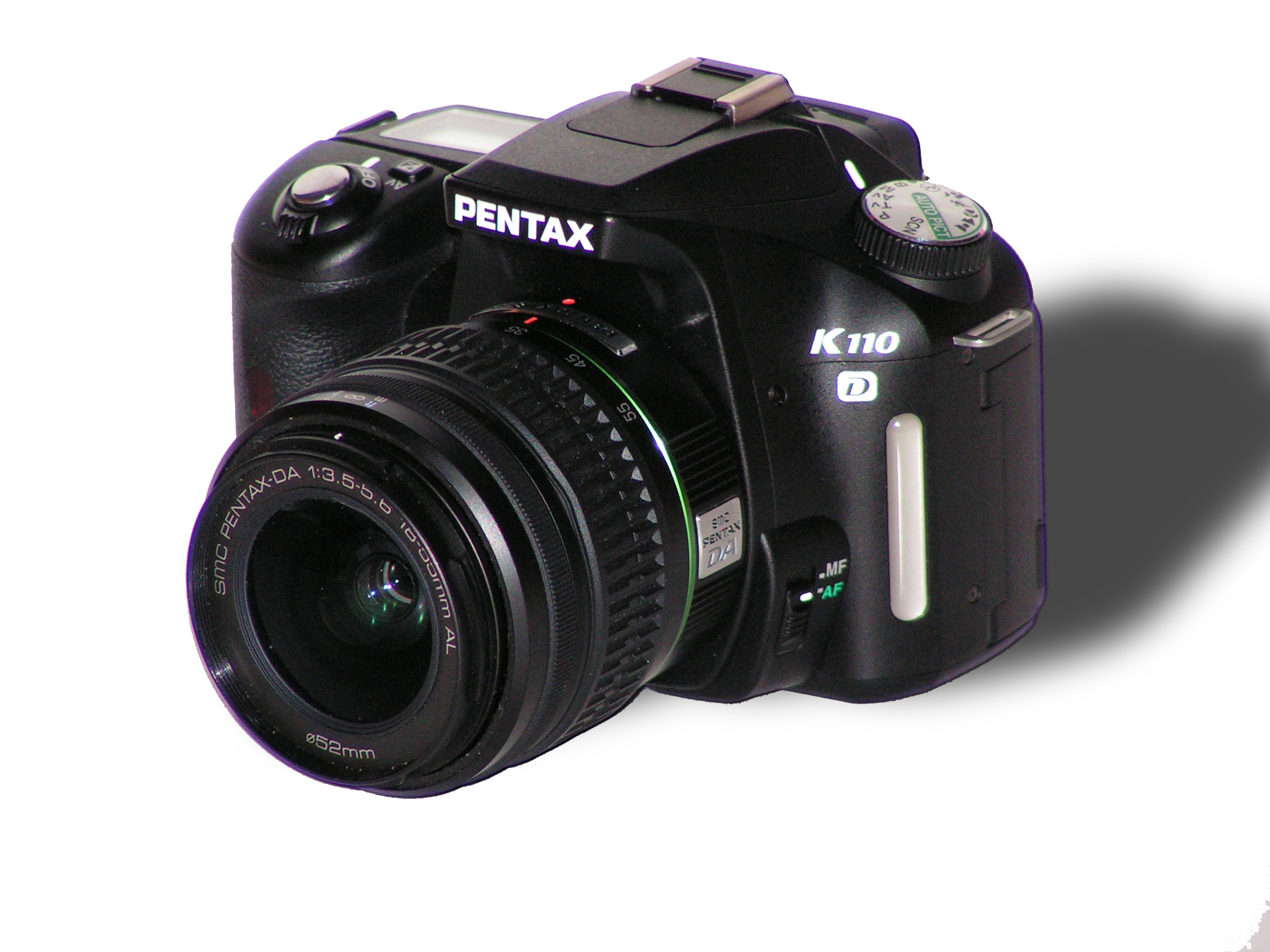

Overview
- Maker: Pentax
- Type: DSLR

Lens
- Lens mount: K-mount
- Lens: Interchangeable Pentax KAF Mount

Sensor/medium
- Sensor: Interline interlace CCD
- Maximum resolution: 3,008 × 2,008 (6 million)
- Film speed: ISO 200–3200
- Recording medium: SD, SDHC with firmware update

Focusing
- Focus modes: Manual, Single shot AF, Continuous AF, Automatic AF Selection (AF operation subject to lens compatibility)
- Focus areas: 11 zone selectable: single area, dynamic area, closest subject

Exposure/metering
- Exposure modes: Automatic, Scene, Program, Shutter Priority, Aperture Priority, Manual, Bulb, Flash off, Night, Moving Object, Macro, Landscape, Portrait
- Exposure metering: TTL phase-matching 11-point autofocus system
- Metering modes: Spot, Center Weighted, Matrix

Flash
- Flash: Built-in retractable P-TTL pop-up with hotshoe

Shutter
- Shutter: Electronically controlled vertical-run focal plane shutter
- Shutter speed range: 1/4000 to 30 seconds, bulb; 1/180 flash
- Continuous shooting: 2.8 frame/s, 5 JPEG, 3 RAW

Viewfinder
- Viewfinder: Optical Viewfinder -Pentamirror with Natural-Bright-Matte II focusing screen

Image processing
- White balance: Auto, Daylight, Shade, Cloudy, Tungsten Light, Fluorescent Light (W, D, N), Flash, Manual

General
- LCD screen: 2.5-inch low temperature polysilicon TFT, 210,000 pixels
- Battery: AA (×4) or CR-V3 (×2)
- Weight: 485 g (17 oz) without battery;
- Made in: Philippines

The K110D is Pentax's entry-level DSLR. It has 6.1 Megapixels (6.1 Million effective pixels). The K110D is youngest of three sibling cameras in terms of specifications. It differs from the K100D only in lacking an in-body image stabilization system.

The K110D has a 2.5 in LCD screen with 210,000 pixels of resolution. It uses Secure Digital cards to record both JPEG and RAW image formats. The K110D uses AA alkaline batteries to power it, though an AC adapter is also compatible. It has a 23.5 mm x 15.7 mm CCD sensor to record its images. The body itself comprises a stainless steel chassis with a fiber reinforced plastic shell for durability. Continuous shooting mode allows for up to 2.8 frames per second to be recorded, which is five JPEGs (on highest quality setting) or three RAW format images. The Camera is compatible with PictBridge printers. The DSLR is considered "entry-class" among DSLRs.

With firmware update, using SDHC cards is possible. Latest firmware version is 1.02.

== Marketing and Sibling Details ==
Said to be shipped in August, 2006, the body would be sold in addition to a smc 18-55mm lens for about $599.99. The K110D would have virtually the same specifications as its superior, the K100D. The most noticeable difference was the Shake-Reduction system found in the K100D and K10D models. Pentax claimed that the Shake-Reduction system would offer a two-stop advantage, and produce almost blur-free images.

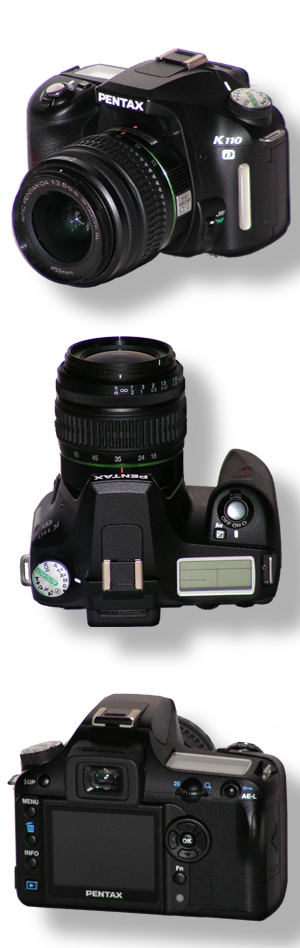
K110D, various views.

Ned Bunnell, the Pentax Imaging Company's director of marketing, was quoted saying:

“The ease-of-use, advanced features and attractive price make the Pentax K100D digital SLR a perfect choice for users moving up from a point-and-shoot camera", meaning that the new Pentax DSLRs were easy to use, even for a beginner. The K110D and K100D, unlike the K10D, do not have the typical aperture adjustment wheel found under the shutter release button on most DSLRs.

The K100D, K100D Super and K110D have been discontinued in favor of the K200D and K-m.

== Notes and references ==
- Pentax Imaging "K110D"
- Digital Photography Review "Pentax K100D and K110D"
- PopPhoto "New Pentax K100D DSLR Features Shake Reduction System"

Type	Sensor	Class	2003	2004	2005	2006		2007	2008	2009	2010	2011	2012	2013	2014	2015	2016	2017	2018	2019	2020	2021	2022	2023	2024	2025
DSLR	MF	Professional										645D				645Z										
DSLR	FF	Professional																K-1		K-1 II						
DSLR	APS-C	High-end															K-3 II						K-3 III			
DSLR	APS-C	High-end													K-3											
DSLR	APS-C	Advanced									K-7	K-5		K-5 II / K-5 IIs												
DSLR	APS-C	Advanced		*ist D			K10D		K20D									KP								
DSLR	APS-C	Midrange					K100D	100DS	K200D					K-30	K-50			K-70						KF		
DSLR	APS-C	Entry-level			*ist DS	*ist DS2						K-r			K-500	K-S2										
DSLR	APS-C	Entry-level			*ist DL	DL2	K110D			K-m/K2000	K-x					K-S1										
MILC	APS-C	K-mount											K-01													
MILC	1/1.7"	Q-mount													Q7											
MILC	1/1.7"	Q-mount														Q-S1										
MILC	1/2.3"	Q-mount											Q	Q10												
DSLR	Prototypes		MZ-D (2000); 645D Prototype (2006); AP 50th Anniv. (2007)																							
Type	Sensor	Class																								
Type	Sensor	Class	2003	2004	2005	2006		2007	2008	2009	2010	2011	2012	2013	2014	2015	2016	2017	2018	2019	2020	2021	2022	2023	2024	2025
