= Samsung Digimax A6 =

Digital camera

Overview
- Maker: Samsung Group
- Type: Point-and-shoot

Lens
- Lens: Fixed SHD-lens, 7.7–23.1 mm f/2.7–f/4.9

Sensor/medium
- Sensor: 1/1.8-inch CCD (6.0 megapixels)
- Maximum resolution: 2816 × 2112
- Film speed: Auto, 100, 200, 400
- Storage media: SD/MMC card, 32 MB internal memory

Focusing
- Focus modes: Contrast autofocus

Exposure/metering
- Exposure modes: Auto, Shutter speed priority, Aperture priority, manual
- Exposure metering: TTL
- Metering modes: Spot, Matrix

Shutter
- Shutter: Mechanical and electronic
- Shutter speed range: 15–1/2000 s
- Continuous shooting: 2, 4, and 8 frames

Viewfinder
- Viewfinder: Optical

Image processing
- White balance: Auto, Daylight, Cloudy, Fluorescent_H, Fluorescent_L, Tungsten, Custom

General
- LCD screen: 1.8″ TFT LCD
- Battery: 2× AA, or CR-V3
- Dimensions: 109.2×55.9×33.0 mm (4.30×2.20×1.30 in)
- Weight: 181 g (6 oz) (without batteries and card)

The Samsung Digimax A6 is a digital camera that was produced by Samsung Techwin. It features a 6-megapixel CCD, 12× zoom (3× optical and 4× digital), 4 cm macro, voice recording and 30 frame/s MJPEG video recording. Its list price in 2006 was $199.99. It was succeeded by the Samsung Digimax A7.

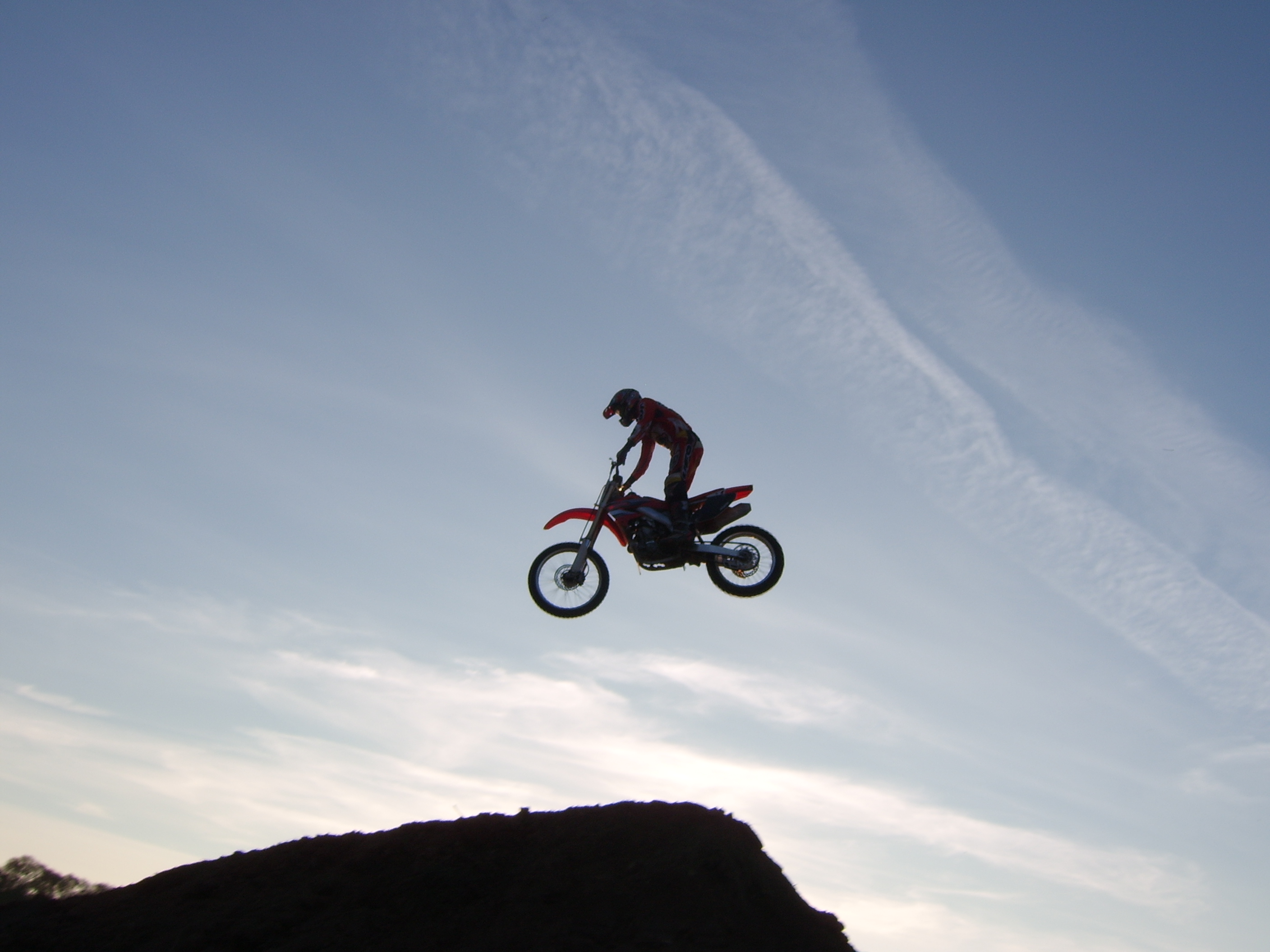
A picture taken with a Digimax A6 camera
