= Pentax K100D =

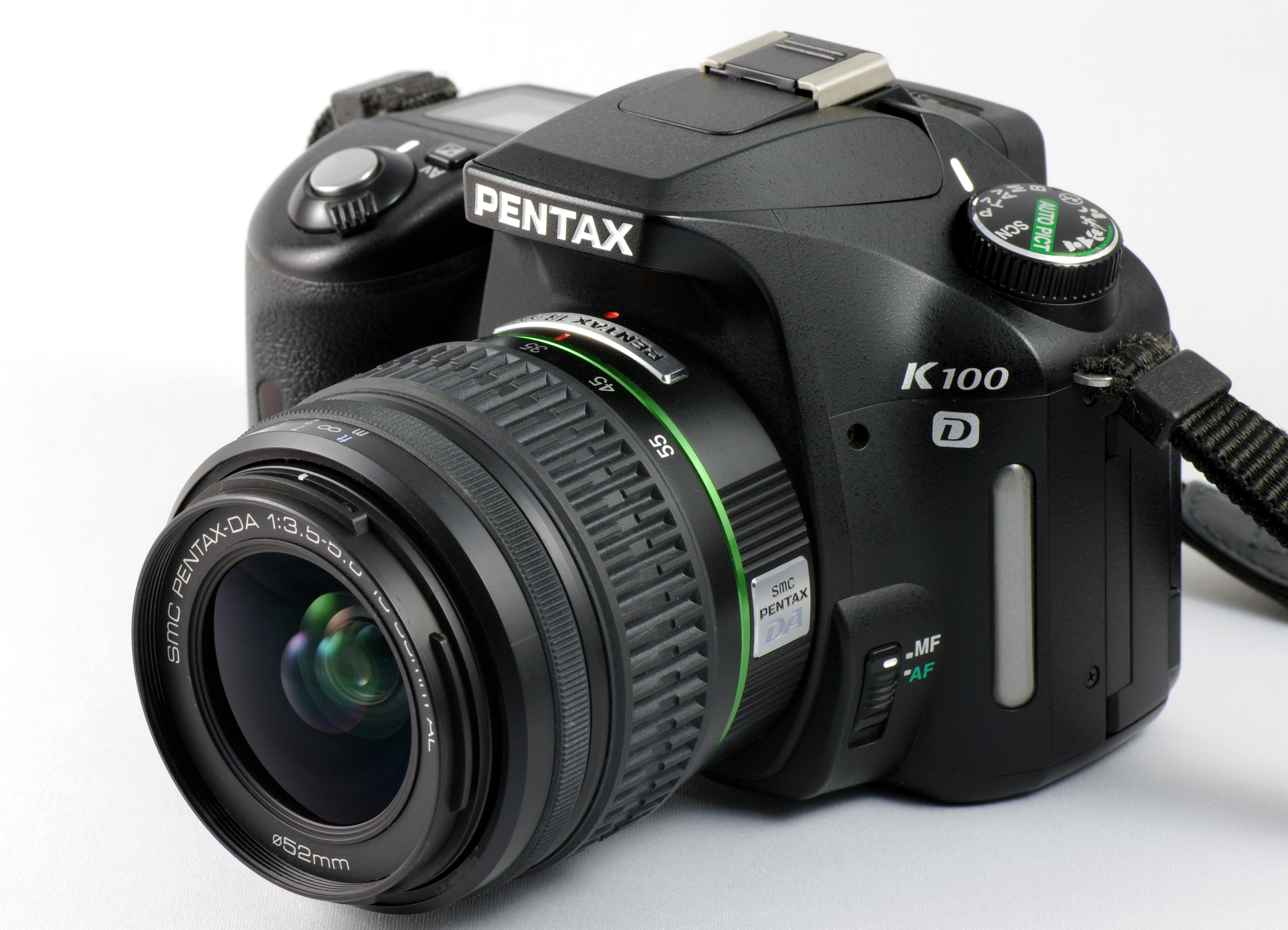
- K100D with kit lens 18-55mm AL

Overview
- Maker: Pentax
- Type: digital single-lens reflex camera

Lens
- Lens: Interchangeable Pentax K_{AF2} mount compatible with Pentax auto-aperture lenses; older lenses supported in stop-down metering mode (using the AE/L function).

Sensor/medium
- Sensor: APS-C (23.5 x 15.7 mm) Interline interlace CCD with a primary color filter
- Maximum resolution: 3,008 x 2,000 (6 megapixels)
- Film speed: ISO Auto, 200, 400, 800, 1600, 3200
- Recording medium: SD, SDHC

Exposure/metering
- Exposure modes: Program, Shutter-Speed Priority, Aperture Priority, Manual, Bulb, Auto, Picture modes (Standard, Portrait, Landscape, Macro, Action, Night scene portrait, Standard flash-off)
- Exposure metering: TTL open-aperture metering with choice of: 16-segment, Center-weighted & Spot meter

Shutter
- Shutter speed range: 1/4000 sec - 30 sec

General
- LCD screen: 2.5", 210,000 pixels
- Battery: AA (×4) or CR-V3 (×2), Optional AC adapter
- Weight: 565 g (20 oz) (1.2 lb)
- Made in: Philippines

The Pentax K100D and similar Pentax K110D are 6-megapixel digital single-lens reflex cameras, launched in the U.S. on May 22, 2006. The K100D has a maximum resolution of 3008 x 2008, and can also down-sample to 2400 x 1600 and 1536 x 1024. The slowest metered shutter speed is 30 seconds and the fastest shutter is 1/4000 seconds.

The K100D features a 6-megapixel CCD sensor, coupled with an analog-to-digital converter (ADC) and a sensor-based shake reduction system within the camera body. The K110D has exactly the same features as the K100D, except it lacks built-in shake reduction.

The K100D is sometimes confused with the similarly named, but more advanced, Pentax K10D. The Pentax K200D, successor to the K100D and K100D Super, was officially announced on January 23, 2008.

== K100D Super ==
On June 27, 2007, Pentax announced the K100D Super. It retains the features and the 6.1-megapixel image sensor of the K100D, while adding support for Supersonic Drive Motor(SDM) lenses and dust-reduction technology. Although K100D Super was announced in June, it seems that camera was in production since January 2007 (manufacture date found in Exif data of shots).

The K100D, K100D Super and K110D were discontinued in favor of the K200D and K-m.

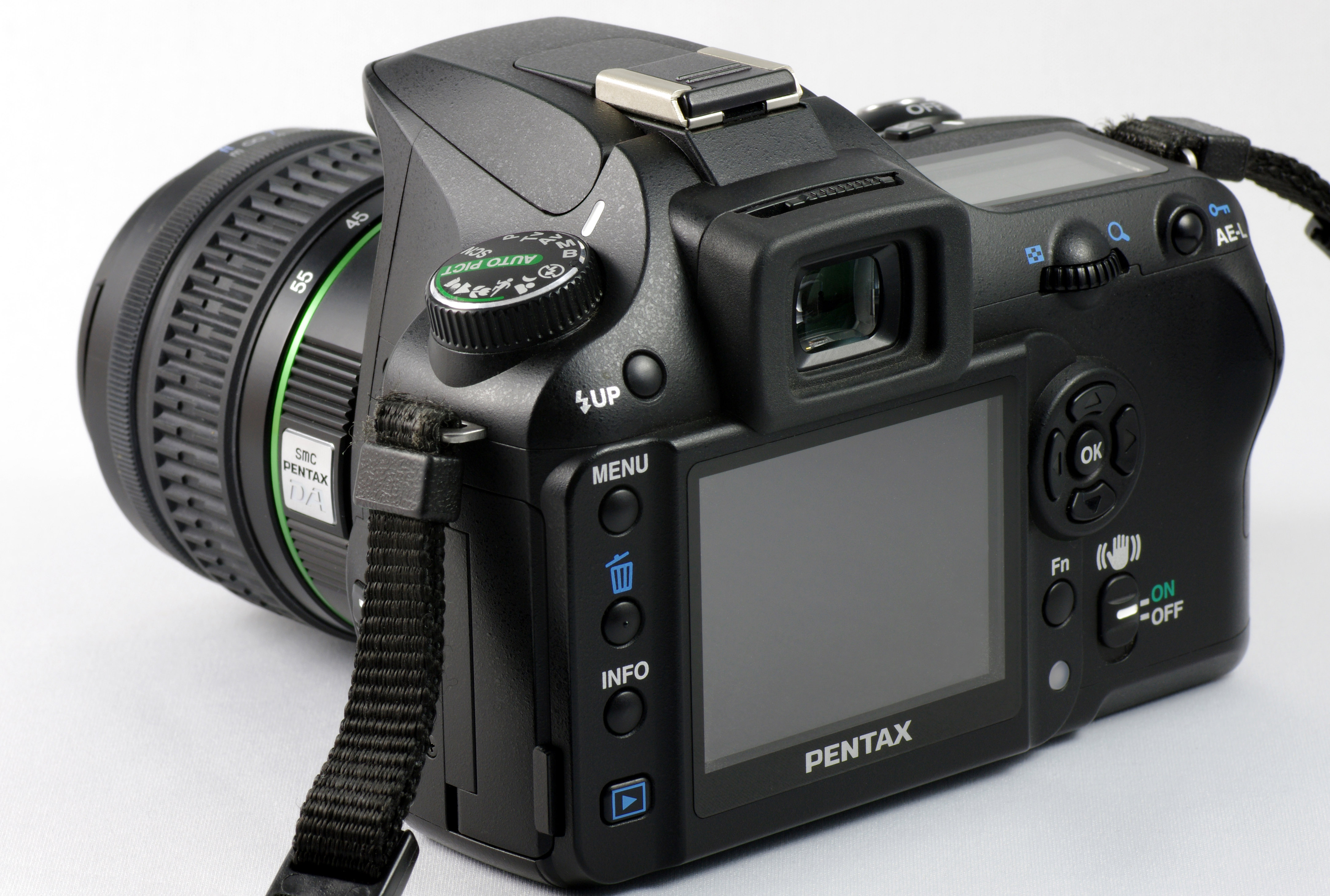
K100D, back

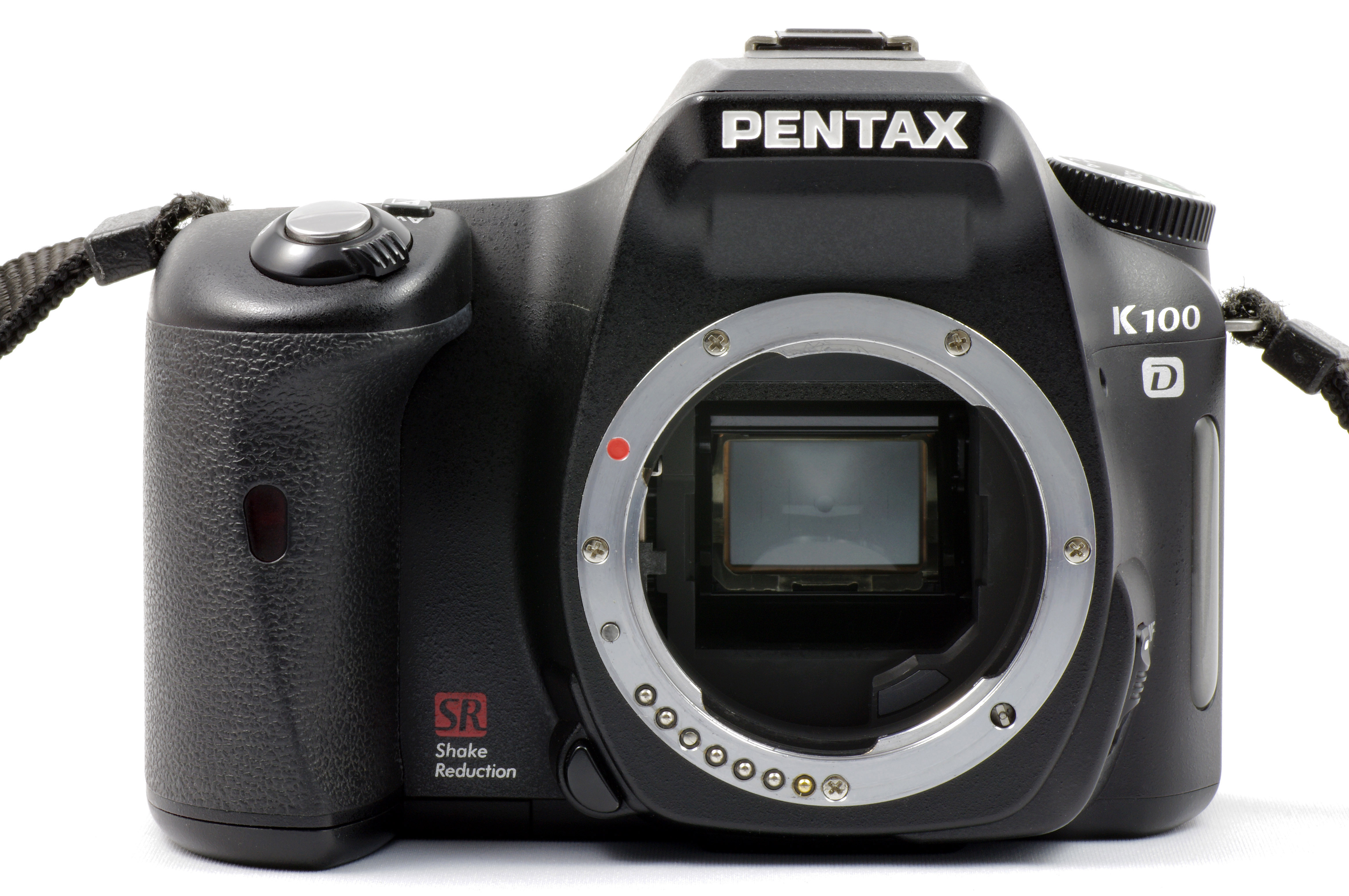
K100D, body without lens

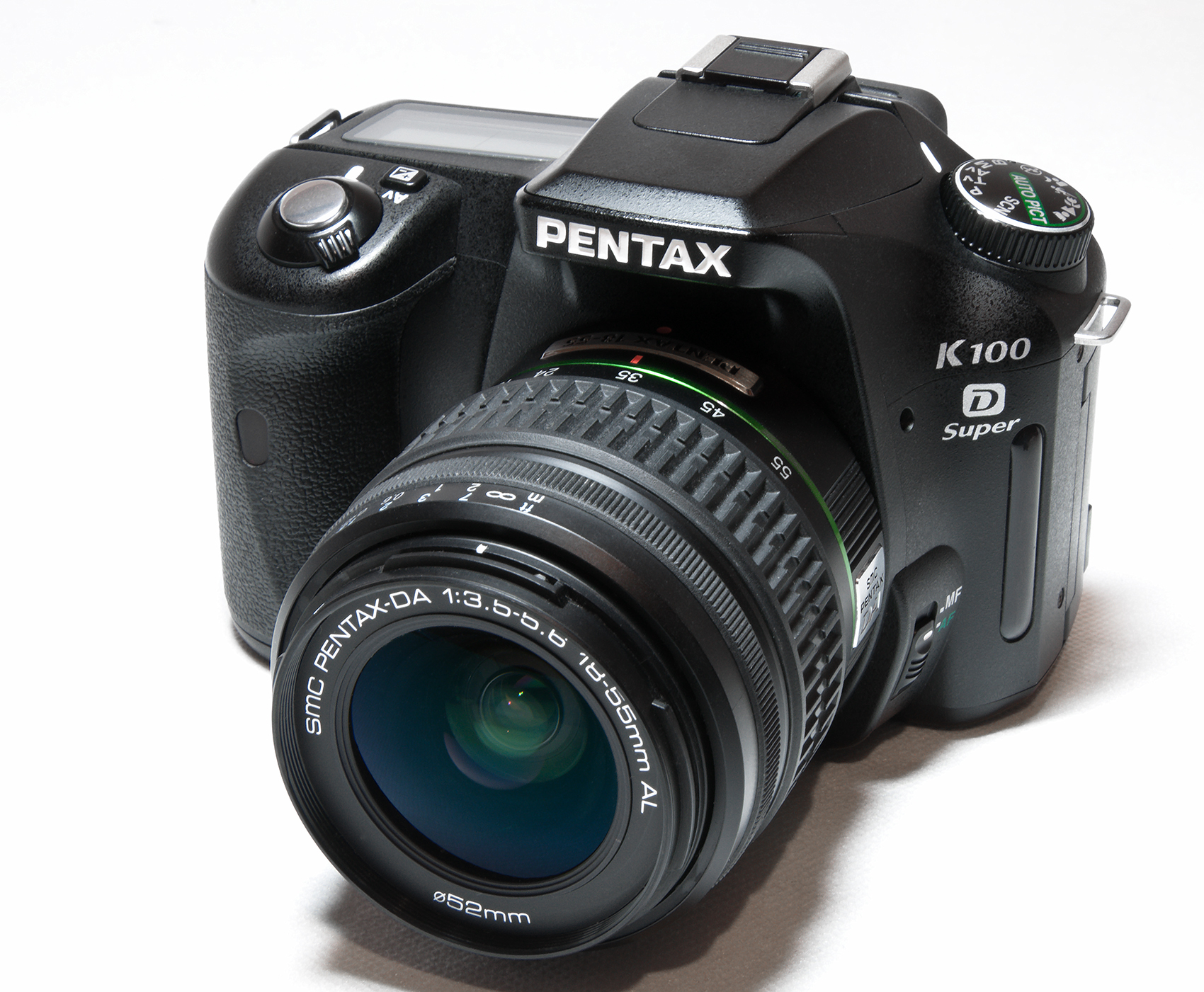
K100D Super

Type	Sensor	Class	2003	2004	2005	2006		2007	2008	2009	2010	2011	2012	2013	2014	2015	2016	2017	2018	2019	2020	2021	2022	2023	2024	2025
DSLR	MF	Professional										645D				645Z										
DSLR	FF	Professional																K-1		K-1 II						
DSLR	APS-C	High-end															K-3 II						K-3 III			
DSLR	APS-C	High-end													K-3											
DSLR	APS-C	Advanced									K-7	K-5		K-5 II / K-5 IIs												
DSLR	APS-C	Advanced		*ist D			K10D		K20D									KP								
DSLR	APS-C	Midrange					K100D	100DS	K200D					K-30	K-50			K-70						KF		
DSLR	APS-C	Entry-level			*ist DS	*ist DS2						K-r			K-500	K-S2										
DSLR	APS-C	Entry-level			*ist DL	DL2	K110D			K-m/K2000	K-x					K-S1										
MILC	APS-C	K-mount											K-01													
MILC	1/1.7"	Q-mount													Q7											
MILC	1/1.7"	Q-mount														Q-S1										
MILC	1/2.3"	Q-mount											Q	Q10												
DSLR	Prototypes		MZ-D (2000); 645D Prototype (2006); AP 50th Anniv. (2007)																							
Type	Sensor	Class																								
Type	Sensor	Class	2003	2004	2005	2006		2007	2008	2009	2010	2011	2012	2013	2014	2015	2016	2017	2018	2019	2020	2021	2022	2023	2024	2025
