= Samsung Digimax A7 =

Digital camera

Overview
- Maker: Samsung Group
- Type: Point-and-shoot

Lens
- Lens: Fixed SHD-lens, 38–114 mm f/2.7–f/4.9

Sensor/medium
- Sensor: 1/1.8-inch CCD (7.0 megapixels)
- Maximum resolution: 3072 × 2304
- Film speed: Auto, 100, 200, 400
- Storage media: SD/MMC card, 32 MB internal memory

Focusing
- Focus modes: Contrast autofocus

Exposure/metering
- Exposure modes: Auto, Shutter speed priority, Aperture priority, manual
- Exposure metering: TTL
- Metering modes: Spot, Matrix

Shutter
- Shutter: Mechanical and electronic
- Shutter speed range: 15–1/2000 s
- Continuous shooting: 2, 4, and 8 frames

Viewfinder
- Viewfinder: Optical

Image processing
- White balance: Auto, Daylight, Cloudy, Fluorescent_H, Fluorescent_L, Tungsten, Custom

General
- LCD screen: 2.0″ TFT LCD
- Battery: 2× AA, or CR-V3
- Dimensions: 109.8×56.8×34.1 mm (4.32×2.24×1.34 in)
- Weight: 166 g (6 oz) (without batteries and card)

The Samsung Digimax A7 (codename Kenox D7) is a digital camera which was produced by Samsung Techwin as a successor to the Samsung Digimax A6. It featured a 7-megapixel CCD, 15× zoom (3× optical and 5× digital), 4 cm macro, voice recording, and 30 frame/s MJPEG video recording.
