= Rechargeable alkaline battery =

Type of battery

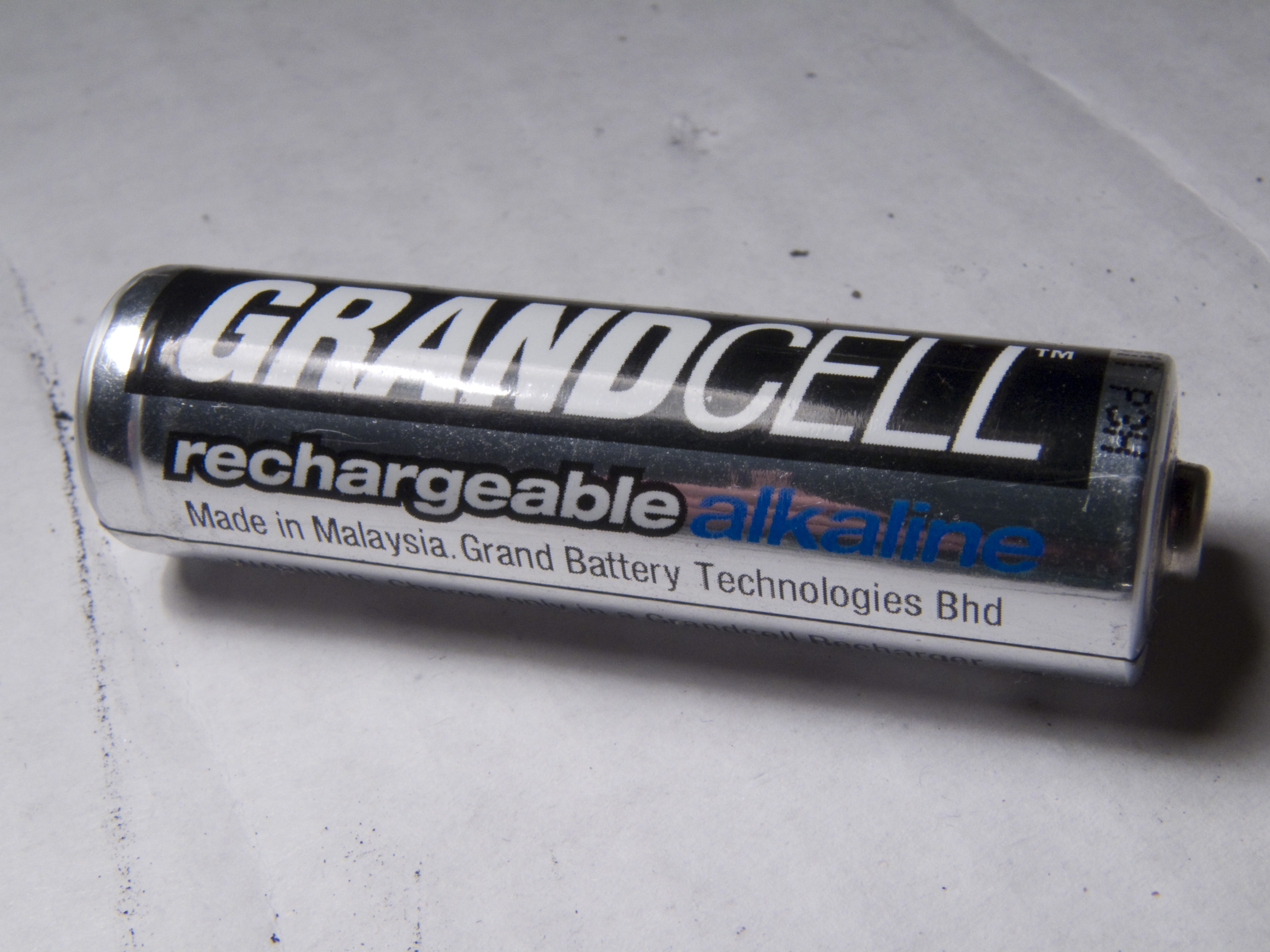
- Rechargeable Alkaline AA battery
- Self-discharge rate: <1%/month at 20 °C
- Cycle durability: 25 cycles (deep), 500+ shallow
- Nominal cell voltage: 1.5 V

A rechargeable alkaline battery, also known as alkaline rechargeable or rechargeable alkaline manganese (RAM), is a type of alkaline battery that is capable of recharging for repeated use. The formats include AAA, AA, C, D, and snap-on 9-volt batteries. Rechargeable alkaline batteries are manufactured fully charged and have the ability to hold their charge for years, longer than nickel-cadmium and nickel-metal hydride batteries, which self-discharge. Rechargeable alkaline batteries can have a high recharging efficiency and have less environmental impact than disposable cells.

== History ==
The first generation rechargeable alkaline batteries were introduced by Union Carbide and Mallory in the early 1970s. Several patents were introduced after Union Carbide's product discontinuation and eventually, in 1986, Battery Technologies Inc of Canada was founded to commercially develop a 2nd generation product based on those patents, under the trademark "RAM". Their first product to be licensed out and sold commercially was to Rayovac under the trademark "Renewal". The next year, "Pure Energy" batteries were released by Pure Energy. After the Renewals were reformulated to be mercury-free in 1995, subsequent licensed RAM alkalines were mercury-free and included ALCAVA, AccuCell, Grandcell and EnviroCell. Subsequent patent and advancements in technology have been introduced.

== Construction of rechargeable cells ==
Rechargeable alkaline cells are constructed very similarly to disposable alkaline cells. A cathode paste is pressed into a steel can that forms the positive terminal of the battery. The negative electrode consists of zinc powder suspended in a gel, with a steel nail contact that runs to the base of the cell to form the negative terminal. Features of the rechargeable alkaline that differ from a disposable alkaline cell include:

- The presence of barium sulfate or other additives in the cathode mix, which improve cycling and increase capacity by preventing the formation of insoluble manganese compounds.
- The cathode also has a catalyst to recombine any hydrogen that forms; hydrogen is produced as the fine zinc grains created during recharge are corroded by the electrolyte.
- Zinc oxide is added to the cathode mix to reduce generation of hydrogen gas; the zinc oxide dissociates on charge to form oxygen.
- The separator between anode and cathode is formulated to be particularly resistant to growth of zinc grains, which could penetrate and short-circuit the cell.

The cells are manufactured in the charged state, ready to use.

== Charge behavior ==
Although these batteries can be used in any device that supports a standard size (AA, AAA, C, D, etc.), they are formulated to last longest in periodical use items. This type of battery is better suited for use in low-drain devices such as remote controls or for devices that are used periodically such as flashlights, television remote control handsets, portable radios, etc. If they are discharged by less than 25%, they can be recharged for hundreds of cycles to about 1.42 V. If they are discharged by less than 50%, they can be almost fully recharged for a few dozen cycles, to about 1.32 V. After a deep discharge, they can be brought to their original high-capacity charge only after a few charge-discharge cycles.

== Recharging of disposable alkalines ==
Manufacturers do not support recharging of disposable alkaline batteries, and warn that it may be dangerous. Despite this advice, alkaline batteries have been recharged, and chargers have been available. The capacity of a recharged alkaline battery declines with number of recharges, until it becomes unusable after typically about ten cycles. Low-ripple direct current is not suitable for charging disposable alkaline batteries; more suitable is a current pulsed at a rate of 40 to 200 pulses per second, with an 80% duty cycle. Pulsed charging appears to reduce the risk of electrolyte—usually potassium hydroxide (KOH)—leakage. The charging current must be low to prevent rapid production of gases that can rupture the cell. Cells that have leaked electrolyte are unsafe and unsuitable for reuse. Fully discharged cells recharge less successfully than only partly depleted cells, particularly if they have been stored in a discharged state—battery charger manufacturers do not claim to recharge dead cells.

Attempting to recharge a discharged alkaline battery can cause the production of gas within the sealed canister; pressure generated by rapid accumulation of gas can open the pressure-relief seal and cause leakage of electrolyte. Potassium hydroxide in the electrolyte is corrosive and may cause injury and damage.

As an alkaline battery is discharged, chemicals inside the battery react to create an electric current. As the chemicals are used up and the products of the reaction accumulate, eventually the battery is no longer able to deliver adequate current, and the battery is depleted. By driving a current through the battery in the reverse direction, the equilibrium can be shifted back towards the original reactants. Different batteries rely on different chemical reactions. Some reactions are readily reversible, some are not. The reactions used in most alkaline batteries fall into the latter category. In particular, the metallic zinc generated by driving a reverse current through the cell will generally not return to its original location in the cell, and may form crystals that damage the separator layer between battery anode and electrolyte.

== Comparison to other rechargeable batteries ==
The rechargeable alkaline battery was, at one time, cheaper than other rechargeable types. Cells can be manufactured in the fully charged state and retain capacity well. Their capacity is about 2/3 that of primary cells. They are of dry-cell construction, completely sealed and not requiring maintenance. Cells have a limited cycle life, which is affected by deep discharge; the first cycle gives the greatest capacity, and if deeply discharged a cell may provide only 20 cycles. The available energy on each cycle decreases. Like primary alkaline cells, they have a relatively high internal resistance, making them unsuitable for high discharge current (for example, discharging their full capacity in one hour).

Unlike rechargeable alkaline batteries, NiMH batteries can endure anywhere from a few hundred to a thousand (or more) deep discharge cycles, resulting in a long useful life; their limitation is now more usually by age rather than cycles. The capacity of NiMH batteries is close to that of alkaline batteries. Unlike rechargeable or primary cell alkaline batteries, NiMH batteries have low internal resistance. This makes NiMH batteries better suited for high current applications than alkaline batteries. Self-discharge rates are comparable between NiMH and alkaline batteries during the first six months.

Rechargeable alkaline batteries produce a voltage of about 1.5V, compared with NiCd and NiMH batteries which produce about 1.2V. For some applications, this can make a significant difference. In cases where resistance is not strongly dependent on voltage or current, since power varies as the square of voltage, rechargeable alkaline batteries provide about 50% more power. For example, incandescent lamps are much brighter when powered by rechargeable alkaline than by NiCd or NiMH batteries.

== Environmental notes ==
Rechargeable alkaline batteries are developed from primary alkaline batteries, designed to resist leakage that a recharge could cause, so they can be safely recharged many times.

According to the websites of EnviroCell, PureEnergy and old Rayovac packaging, these manufacturers' rechargeable alkaline batteries have no mercury or cadmium.

== See also ==
- List of battery types
- List of battery sizes
- Comparison of commercial battery types
- Battery recycling
