= Eneloop =

Japanese rechargeable battery brand

- Product type: Rechargeable battery
- Current owner: Panasonic
- Produced by: Panasonic
- Country: Japan
- Introduced: November 2005; 21 years ago
- Markets: Worldwide
- Previous owners: Sanyo
- Tagline: "Recharging a better tomorrow."
- Website: eneloop.panasonic.com

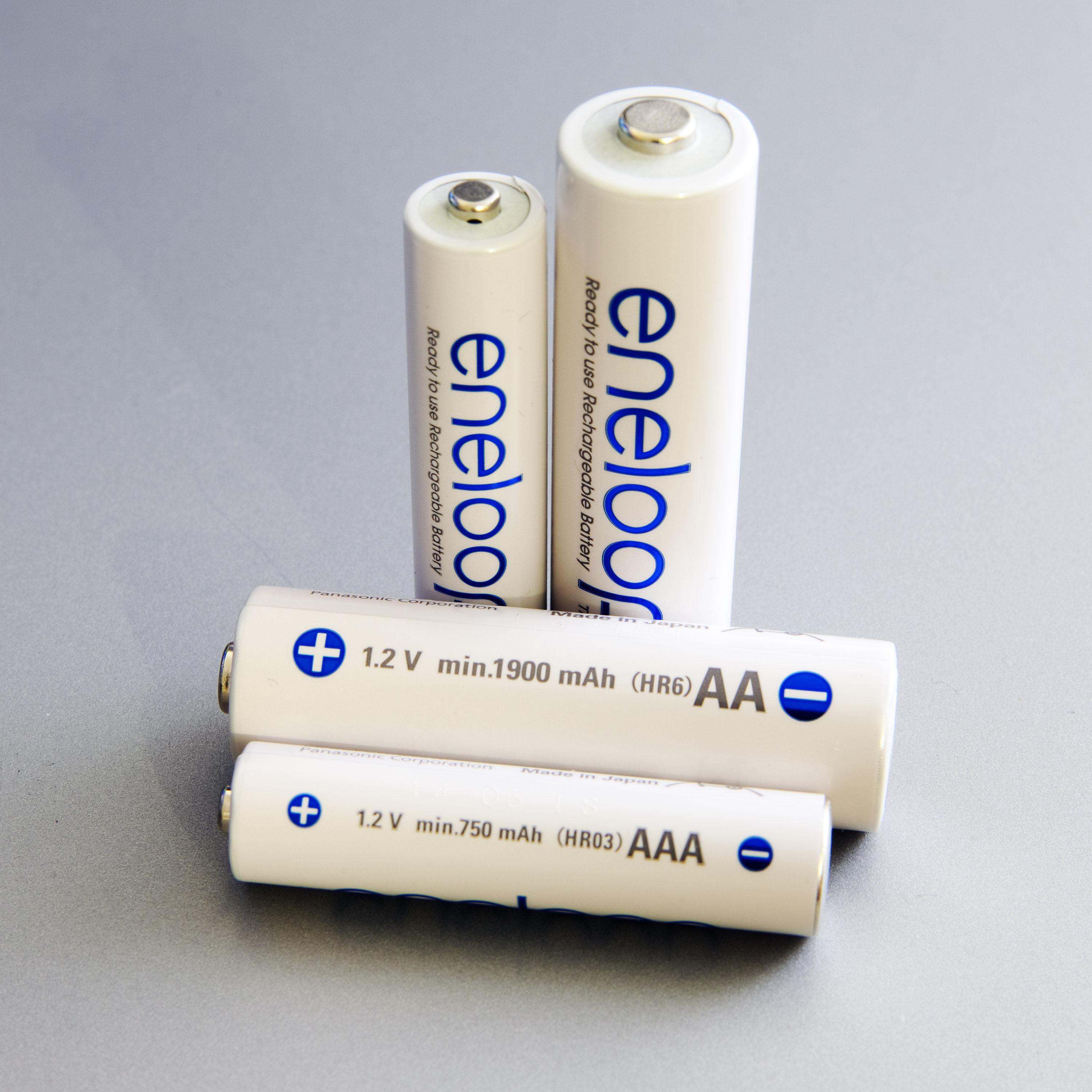
Panasonic's fourth-generation Eneloop batteries, in AA and AAA sizes

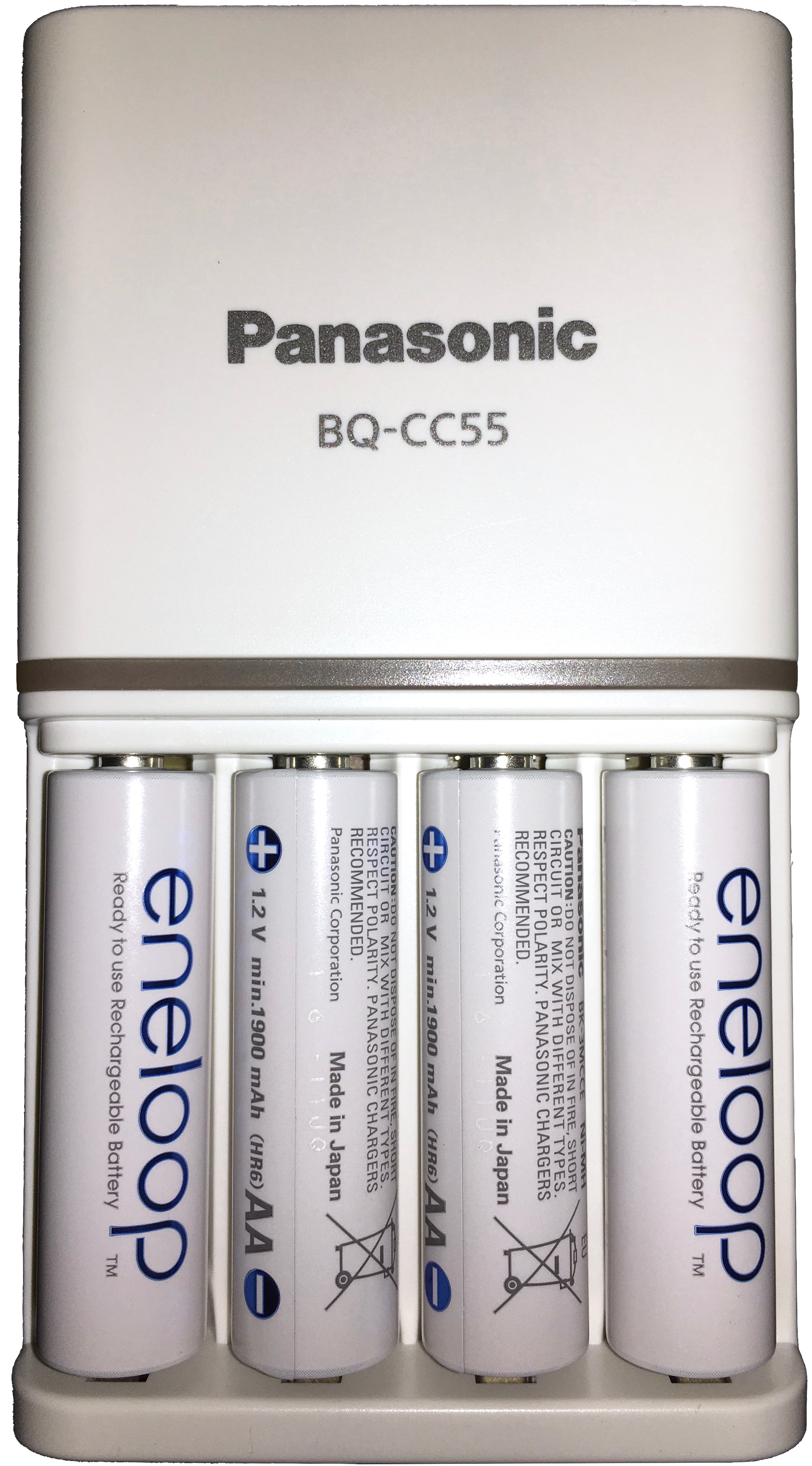
Panasonic Eneloop Smart & Quick Charger BQ-CC55

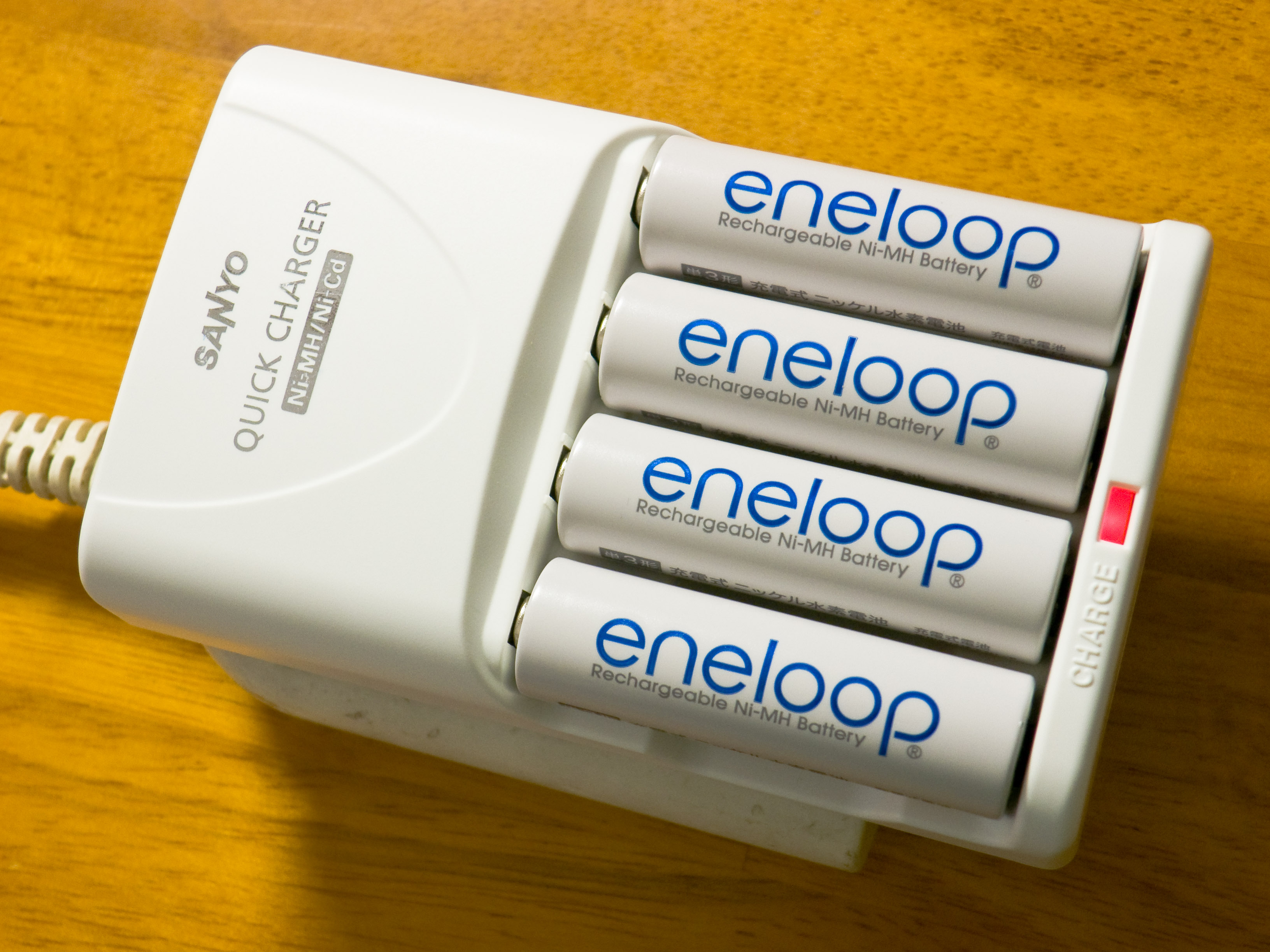
Sanyo Eneloop battery charger

Eneloop (Japanese: エネループ, Hepburn: Enerūpu), stylized as eneloop, is a brand of 1.2-volt low self-discharge nickel–metal hydride (NiMH) rechargeable batteries and accessories developed by Sanyo and introduced in 2005. Panasonic acquired a majority stake in Sanyo in 2009, and Eneloop batteries were thereafter branded, but not manufactured, by Panasonic.

Eneloop cells lose their charge much more slowly than the 0.5–4% per day loss of previously available NiMH batteries, retaining about 85% of their charge for a year after charging; that allows them to be sold precharged. Since then many other makes of NiMH batteries are supplied precharged, with long charge retention.

Since Sanyo introduced the Eneloop, many other brands of low-self-discharge batteries became available, described as "low self-discharge", "LSD" or "pre-charged". By 2020 most NiMH batteries available were of this type, with varying capacity, self-discharge rate, and lifespan. Those made in Japan are all made in the same factory, but not necessarily to the same specification as the Eneloop brand. There are also counterfeits of Eneloop and other well-regarded brands.

Because they can replace a large number of alkaline batteries over their life cycle, Eneloops are marketed as being eco-friendly.

== History ==
Sanyo was acquired by Panasonic in 2009. In exchange for US FTC approval of the takeover, Panasonic agreed to sell Sanyo's portable NiMH battery business to Fujitsu subsidiary FDK in order to preserve competition, and later did so.

Panasonic retained the "Eneloop" trademark, sourcing the batteries from FDK (formerly Sanyo) factories.

== Technology ==
After NiMh rechargeable batteries were introduced, they were developed to increase capacity. This was done by using thinner insulators internally, allowing more of the active components to be used and thus increasing capacity. The thin insulators allowed significant leakage, leading to relatively short self-discharge times. Eneloop batteries were designed in a way that traded off somewhat lower capacity for much slower self-discharge. The trade-off was modified for the Eneloop Pro series, providing higher capacity but with more self-discharge and shorter lifespan. The Eneloop Lite series traded significantly lower capacity for longer lifespan, and also faster charging and lower weight.

== Variant description ==
The Eneloop is the standard general-purpose cell. The cheaper Eneloop Lite has lower capacity and a longer lifespan in charge cycles, but the standard and Lite of about the same time have very similar total lifetime capacity in watt-hours. The more expensive Eneloop Pro has significantly higher capacity and is suitable for higher-current applications, but has poorer charge retention and shorter lifespan in charge cycles; total lifetime capacity in watt-hours is much less than the other versions. Numerical data are listed in the variant comparison tables section. The discontinued Eneloop Plus was similar to the standard Eneloop, with overheating protection.

=== Original Eneloop ===
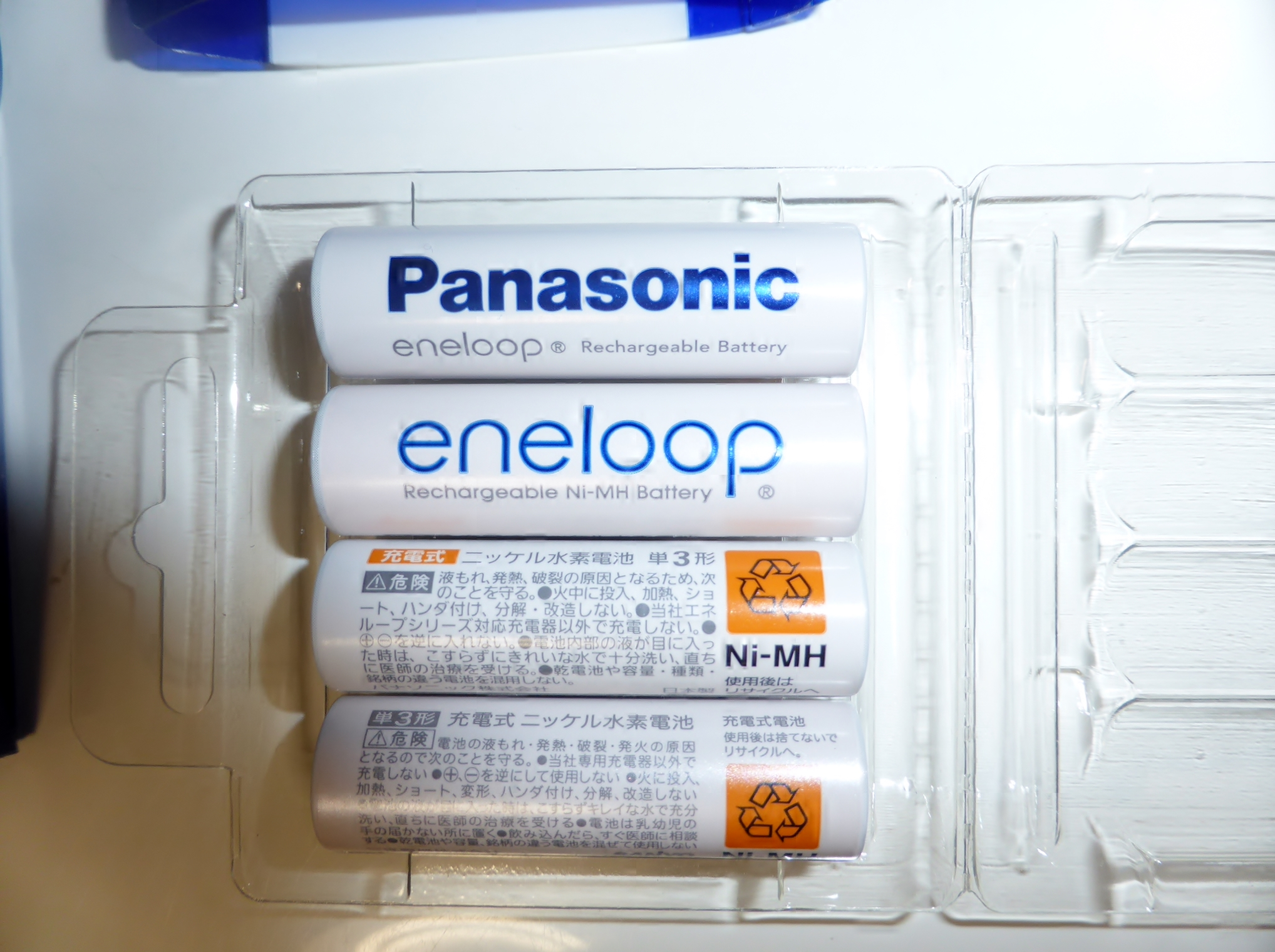
A newer Panasonic Eneloop (top) and older Sanyo AA Eneloop batteries

The original Eneloop batteries were introduced in AA and AAA size, with capacities of 2,000 mAh and 800 mAh. They could be recharged 1,000 times and held up to 75% of their charge after one year. The part numbers for first generation cells are HR-3UTG (AA) and HR-4UTG (AAA).

The second generation of Eneloop AA and AAA batteries was introduced in 2010. It endured 1,500 recharge cycles for depth of discharge (DOD) 60% and held 85% of the charge after one year and 75% after three years. The part numbers for second generation cells are HR-3UTGA (AA) and HR-4UTGA (AAA). Sanyo introduced C- and D-sized Eneloop batteries with a minimum capacity of 2,700 mAh and 3,000 mAh respectively in 2009, along with a new universal charger. As these sizes were only available in Japan and Singapore, Sanyo offered adapter sleeves to fit AA batteries in devices that take C or D batteries.

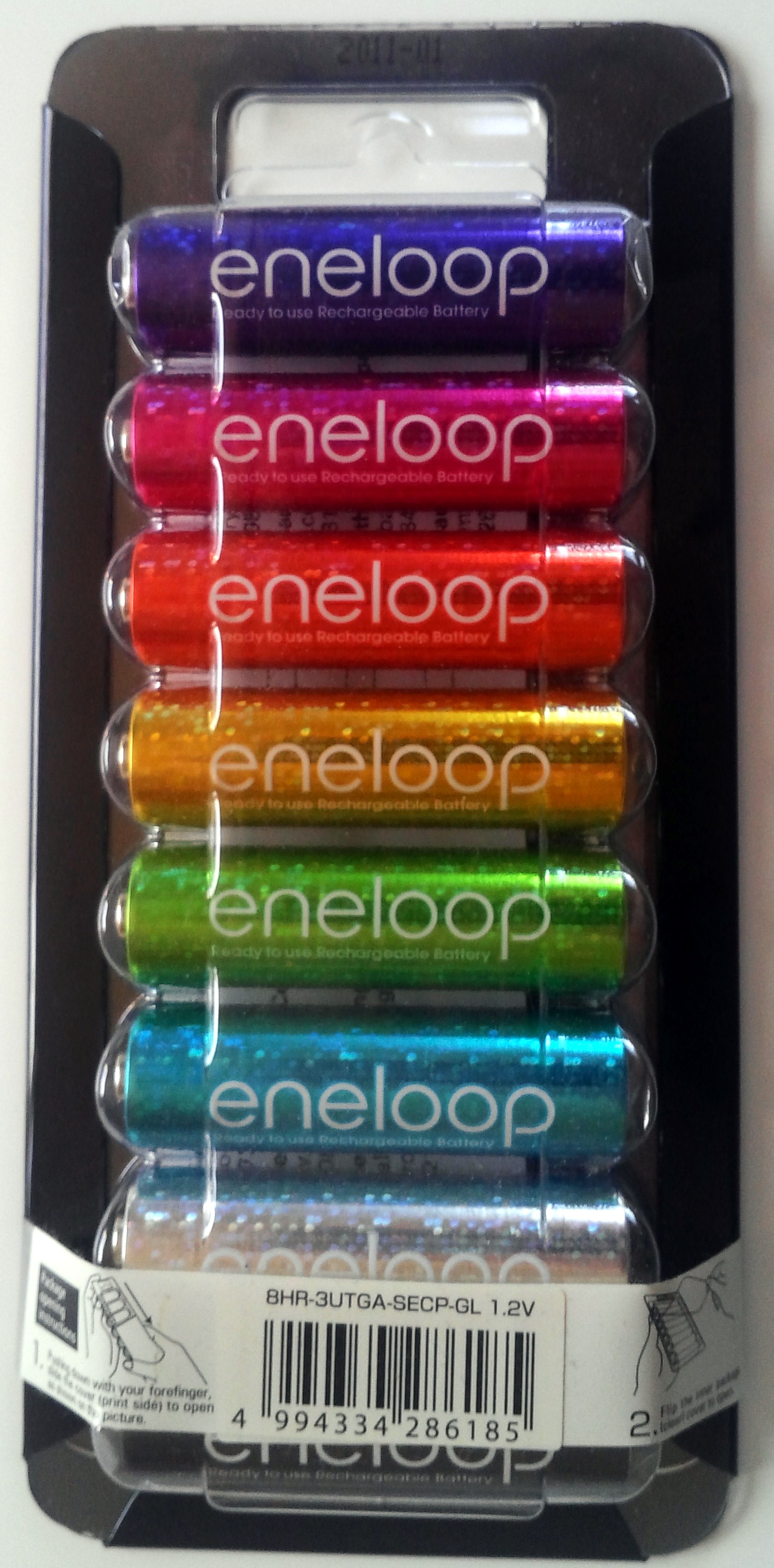
Eneloop 5th anniversary special glitter edition pack

In October 2011 the batteries were again improved to retain up to 90% of their capacity after one year, 80% after three years and 70% after five years. The batteries can be recharged up to 1,800 times, rather than the 1,500 times of the previous revision. The part numbers for third generation cells are HR-3UTGB (AA) and HR-4UTGB (AAA). At the same time, the C- and D-sized Eneloop batteries' stated minimum capacities were increased to 3,000 mAh and 5,700 mAh respectively. They were available in Japan from November 2011. European models went on sale from the beginning of October 2012.

Following the acquisition of Sanyo by Panasonic, a fourth generation was introduced in April 2013. The number of charges per cell was increased from 1800 to 2100 cycles for both AA (BK-3MCC) and AAA (BK-4MCC) models. In some countries the batteries are branded as Panasonic.

A fifth generation was introduced in 2022 (manufactured from at least April 2021). The minimum (guaranteed) capacity was increased from 1900 to 2000 mAh for AA (BK-3MCDx) and from 750 to 800 mAh for AAA (BK-4MCDx) models. These batteries are supposed to hold up to 70% of their charge after 10 years of storage at 20°C.

=== Eneloop Lite ===
The Eneloop Lite line was released in Japan in June 2010. They addressed two disadvantages of alkaline and other NiMH batteries: the initial cost and the long charging time—both achieved by reducing the capacity of the battery. The batteries find suitable applications in low-drain devices such as remote control devices and alarms, where low capacity is not an issue. The AAs have 1,000 mAh of capacity, while the AAAs have 600 mAh. Due to reduction of the capacity compared to the regular Eneloop cells, the charging time is halved for the AA and reduced by 25% for the AAA. On the other hand, they can be recharged 3,000 times. The reduction in capacity also reduced the production cost, which decreased the initial investment for rechargeable batteries. They also weigh 30% less. The product numbers are HR-3UQ (AA) and HR-4UQ (AAA).

Along with the upgrade of the regular Eneloop cells in April 2013, the Lite version was also upgraded. According to Panasonic, it can now be recharged up to 3,000 times (life cycles for DOD 60%) (model numbers BK-3LCC for the AA and BK-4LCC for the AAA battery). The upgraded batteries also retain 90% of the charge after one year like the regular Eneloop cells. Packaging is marked prominently 'Best for DECT' certainly in European markets, suggesting that these batteries are suitable for 'nearly always on charge' applications such as home cordless phones.

=== Eneloop Pro ===
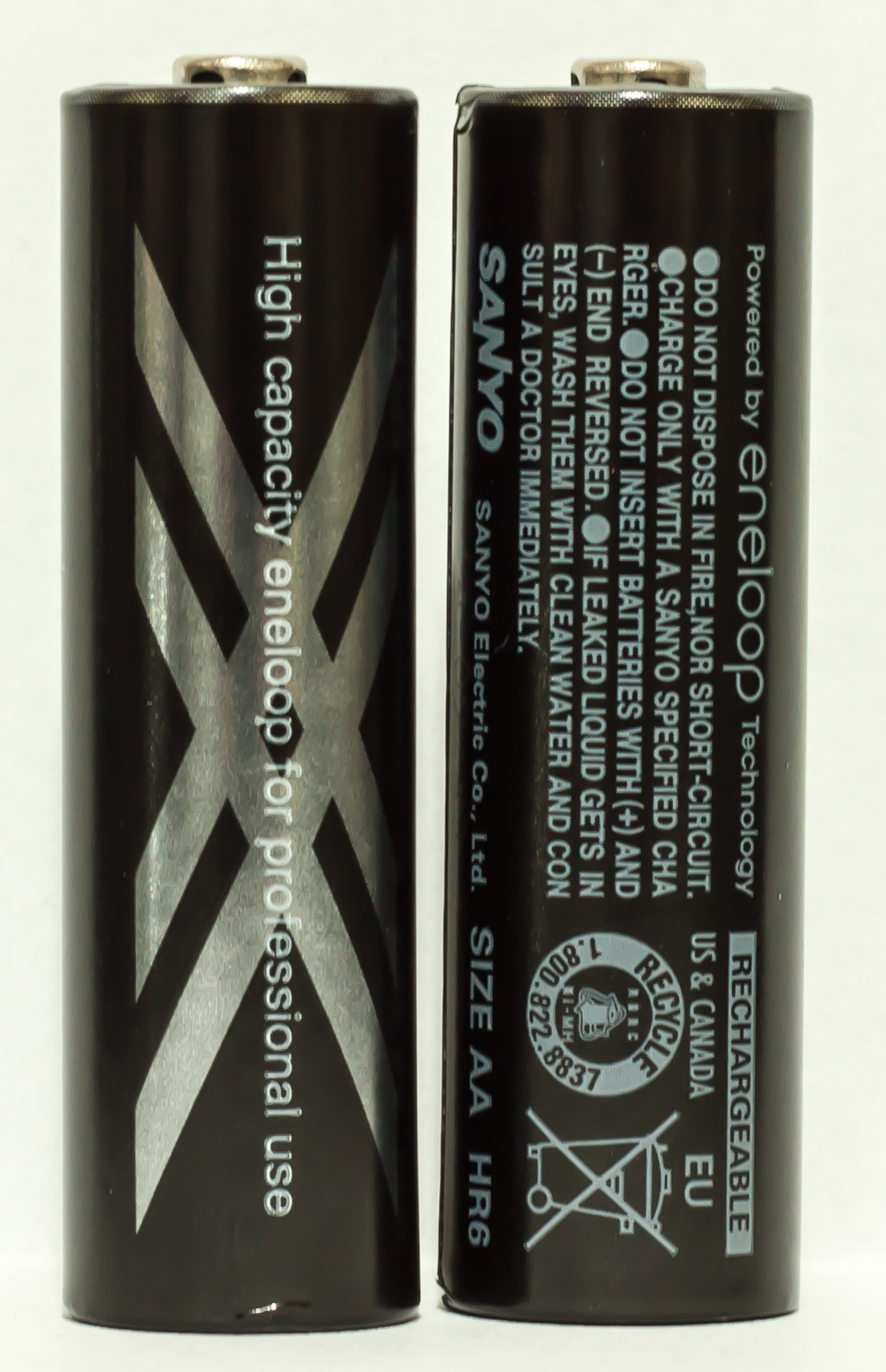
Sanyo Eneloop XX

The Eneloop Pro family have higher capacity in mAh, trading this off against poorer charge retention and shorter lifespan.

The Eneloop Pro (or XX powered by Eneloop Technology in the US, Canada, and Europe) series was introduced in 2011. They have a higher capacity than regular Eneloop cells, 2,500 mAh (min. 2,400 mAh) for AA. They retain 75% of their initial charge after one year, and can be recharged 500 times, significantly less than the standard non-Pro Eneloop line. The product numbers are HR-3UWX (AA) and HR-3UWXA (AA).

In January 2013, Sanyo announced the second generation of Eneloop XX (model HR-3UWXB, or Panasonic BK-3HCC), branded Eneloop Pro. The new generation has a 50 mAh higher capacity (2,550 mAh nominal, 2,450 mAh minimum capacity), and the self-discharge rate was improved, retaining 85% up to one year. They also introduced an AAA version of the Eneloop XX (model HR-4UWXB) with a nominal capacity of 950 mAh (900 mAh minimum). After the acquisition by Panasonic, they were renamed Eneloop Pro (model BK-4HCC) in Europe (BK-4HCCE) and the Americas (BK-4HCCA).

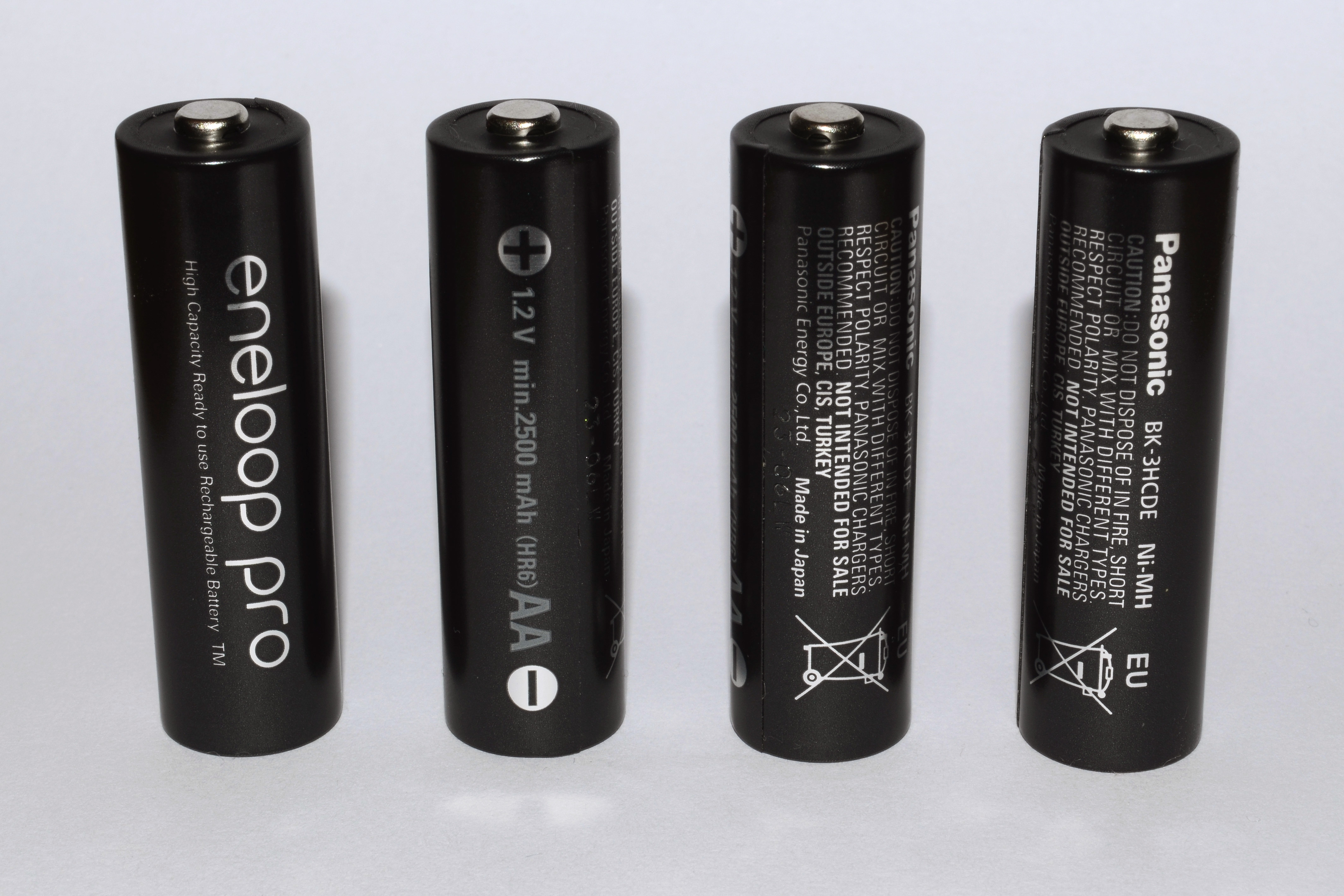
Panasonic Eneloop Pro AA 2500 mAh batteries, type "BK-3HCDE"

In October 2015, Panasonic remodeled Eneloop Pro (BK-3HCD/BK-4HCD). The minimum capacity of the battery increased, by 50 mAh to 2500 mAh for AA and by 30 mAh to 930 mAh for AAA.

=== Eneloop Plus ===
Eneloop Plus cells have a PTC thermistor built-in that cuts the power in case of overheating. This makes them especially suitable for toys and devices that generate significant heat. Other specifications are identical to the second-generation Eneloop batteries. The product number is HR-3UPT (AA), and the battery was released in Japan in December 2011.

== Variant comparison tables ==
=== AA size ===
Variant	Model number prefix	Release date	Capacity (mAh)		Max. cycles (DOD 60%)	Est. lifetime cap. (Wh)	Charge retention					
Variant	Model number prefix	Release date	Min.	Typ.	Max. cycles (DOD 60%)	Est. lifetime cap. (Wh)	After 1 day	After 1 year	After 2 years	After 3 years	After 5 years	After 10 years
Ordinary NiMH battery (Sanyo NiMH 2700)	HR-3UG	Unknown	2,500	2,700	1,000	3240	80%	50%	0%	0%	0%	Unknown
Eneloop 1st generation	HR-3UTG	November 2005	1,900	2,000	1,000	2,400	Unknown	80%	Unknown	Unknown	Unknown	Unknown
Eneloop 2nd generation	HR-3UTGA	May 2010	1,900	2,000	1,500	3,600	Unknown	85%	80%	75%	Unknown	Unknown
Eneloop 3rd generation	HR-3UTGB	November 2011	1,900	2,000	1,800	4,320	Unknown	90%	80%	80%	70%	Unknown
Eneloop 4th generation	BK-3MCC (BK-3MCCE)	April 2013	1,900	2,000	2,100	5,040	Unknown	90%	Unknown	80%	70%	Unknown
Eneloop 5th generation	BK-3MCD (BK-3MCDE)	June 2022	2,000	up to 2,100	2,100	5,292	Unknown	Unknown	Unknown	Unknown	Unknown	70%
Eneloop Lite 1st generation	HR-3UQ	June 2010	950	1,000	2,000	2,400	Unknown	85%	80%	75%	Unknown	Unknown
Eneloop Lite 2nd generation	BK-3LCC	April 2013	950	1,000	3,000	3,600	Unknown	90%	80%	70%	65%	Unknown
Eneloop Pro 1st generation	HR-3UWX; HR-3UWXA	July 2011; May 2012	2,400	2,500	500	1,500	Unknown	75%	Unknown	Unknown	Unknown	Unknown
Eneloop Pro 2nd generation	HR-3UWXB	October 2012	2,450	2,550	500	1,530	Unknown	85%	Unknown	Unknown	Unknown	Unknown
Panasonic Eneloop Pro	BK-3HCC	April 2013	2,450	2,550	500	1,530	Unknown	85%	Unknown	Unknown	Unknown	Unknown
Panasonic Eneloop Pro	BK-3HCD	October 2015	2,500	2,600	500	1,530	Unknown	85%	Unknown	Unknown	Unknown	Unknown

=== AAA size ===
Variant	Model number prefix	Release date	Capacity (mAh)		Max. cycles (DOD 60%)	Est. lifetime cap. (Wh)	Charge retention					
Variant	Model number prefix	Release date	Min.	Typ.	Max. cycles (DOD 60%)	Est. lifetime cap. (Wh)	After 1 day	After 1 year	After 2 years	After 3 years	After 5 years	After 10 years
Ordinary NiMH battery (Sanyo NiMH 1000)	HR-4U	Unknown	930	1,000	Unknown	Unknown	80%	50%	0%	0%	0%	0%
Eneloop 1st generation	HR-4UTG	November 2005	750	800	1,000	960	Unknown	80%	Unknown	Unknown	Unknown	Unknown
Eneloop 2nd generation	HR-4UTGA	May 2010	750	800	1,500	1,440	Unknown	85%	80%	75%	Unknown	Unknown
Eneloop 3rd generation	HR-4UTGB	November 2011	750	800	1,800	1,728	Unknown	90%	80%	80%	70%	Unknown
Eneloop 4th generation	BK-4MCC (BK-4MCCE)	April 2013	750	800	2,100	2,016	Unknown	90%	Unknown	80%	75%	Unknown
Eneloop 5th generation	BK-4MCD (BK-4MCDE)	June 2022	800	up to 850	2,100	2,142	Unknown	Unknown	Unknown	Unknown	Unknown	70%
Eneloop Lite 1st generation	HR-4UQ	June 2010	500	600	2,000	1,440	Unknown	85%	80%	75%	Unknown	Unknown
Eneloop Lite 2nd generation	BK-4LCC	April 2013	550	600	3,000	2,160	Unknown	90%	80%	70%	65%	Unknown
Eneloop Pro 2nd generation	HR-4UWXB	October 2012	900	950	500	570	Unknown	85%	Unknown	Unknown	Unknown	Unknown
Panasonic Eneloop Pro	BK-4HCC	April 2013	900	950	500	570	Unknown	85%	Unknown	Unknown	Unknown	Unknown
Panasonic Eneloop Pro XX	BK-4HCD	October 2015	930	950	500	570	Unknown	85%	Unknown	Unknown	Unknown	Unknown
