= Pentax K200D =

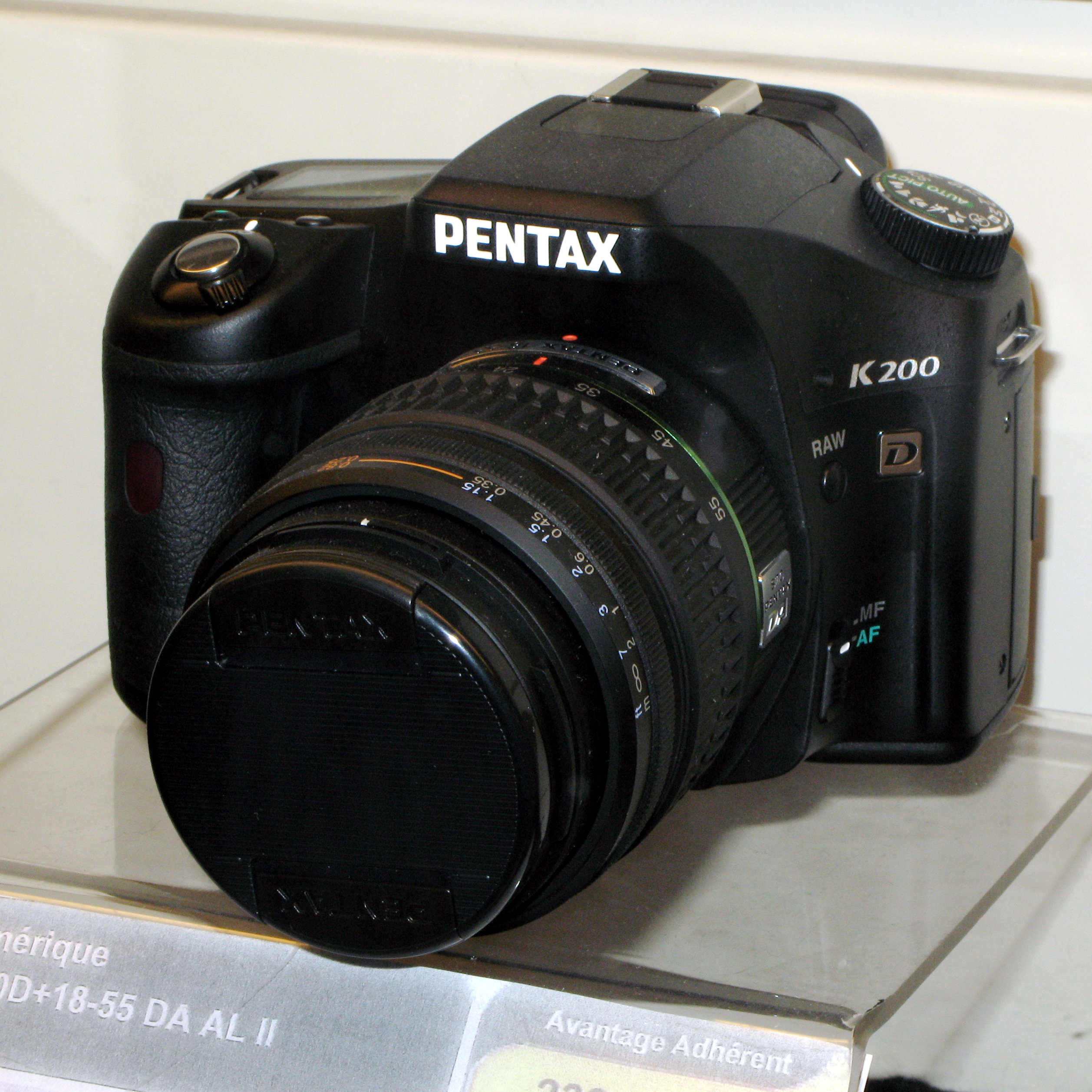

Overview
- Maker: Pentax
- Type: Digital single-lens reflex camera

Lens
- Lens: Interchangeable Pentax "crippled" K_{AF2} mount compatible with Pentax auto-aperture lenses; older lenses supported in stop-down metering mode.

Sensor/medium
- Sensor: CCD image sensor with a primary color filter
- Maximum resolution: 3,872 × 2,592 (10.2 megapixels)
- Film speed: ISO Auto, 100, 200, 400, 800, 1600
- Recording medium: SD, SDHC

Exposure/metering
- Exposure modes: Program, Shutter-Speed Priority, Aperture Priority, Manual, Bulb, Auto, Picture modes (Standard, Portrait, Landscape, Macro, Action, Night scene portrait, Standard flash-off)
- Exposure metering: TTL open-aperture metering with choice of: 16-segment, Center-weighted & Spot meter

Shutter
- Shutter speed range: 1/4000 sec – 30 sec, Bulb

General
- LCD screen: 2.7", 230,000 pixels
- Battery: AA (×4), Optional AC adapter
- Weight: 630 g (22.2 oz) without battery
- Made in: Philippines

The Pentax K200D is a 10.2-megapixel digital single-lens reflex camera, announced on January 24, 2008, along with the higher-end K20D. It was discontinued in December 2008, giving it the distinction of being one of the shortest-lived DSLR cameras.

The K200D is the successor to the well-reviewed K100D, K110D, and K100D Super 6-megapixel DSLR's from Pentax, from which it retains body construction, penta-mirror viewfinder and autofocus module. The K200D adopts several of the features of the more advanced K10D, namely its 10.2 megapixel CCD sensor and body weather-sealing.

The MSRP of the Pentax K200D was $620 for the body only at launch, or $699 with an updated 18-55mm II f/3.5-5.6 kit lens.

== Features ==
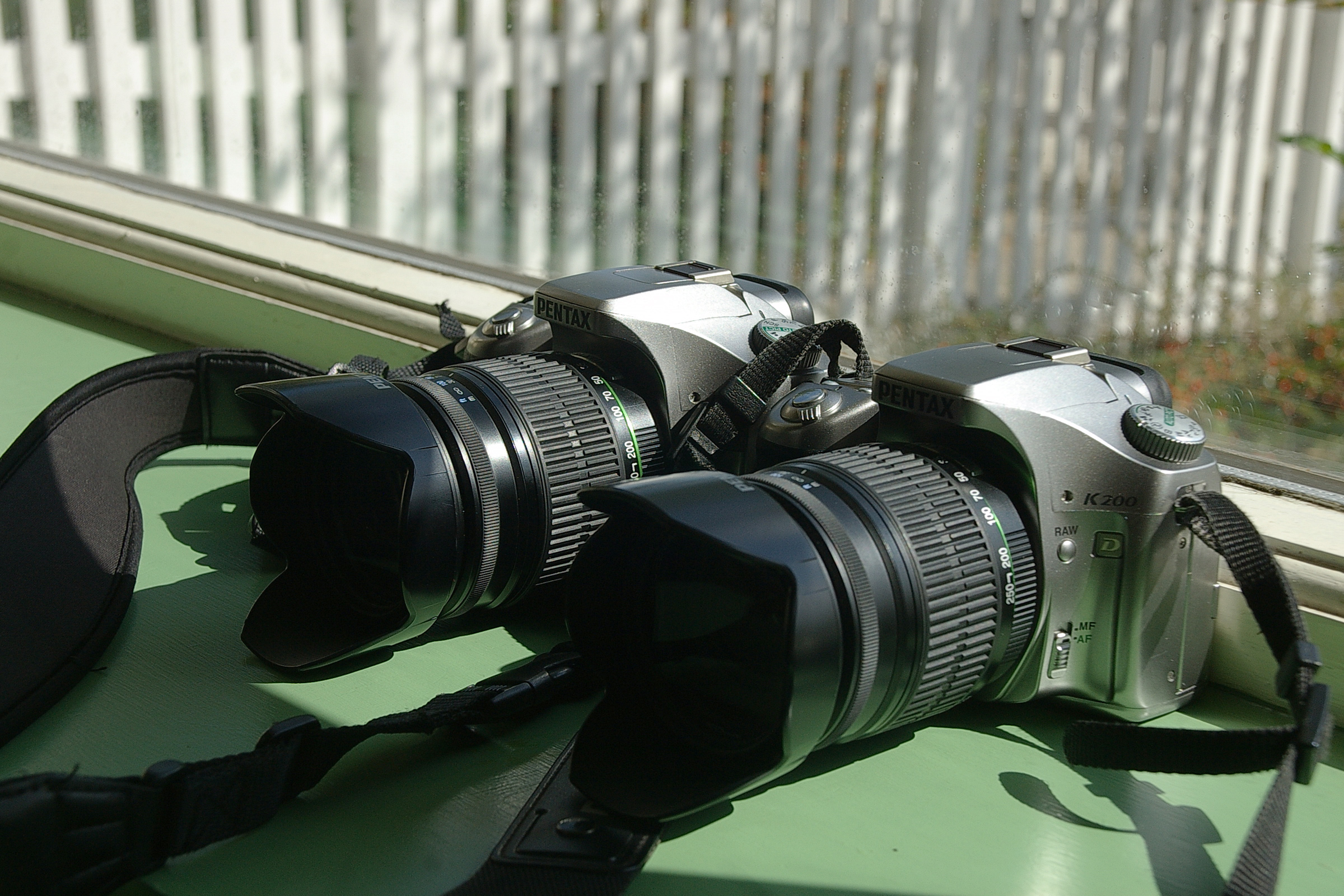
Two Pentax K200D cameras with Sigma 18-250mm lenses. The camera body came in multiple colours, including grey.

The Pentax K200D has 60 seals for weather/dust resistance. It uses non-proprietary AA batteries like previous Pentax entry-level offerings.

The K200D's lens mount is the K-mount.

The K200D's on-board flash can be used to allow wireless control of Pentax or compatible flashes as a Master (The on-board flash fires during the capture), or as a Controller (The on-board flash does not fire during the capture). This supports P-TTL, but can also be used to fire the external flashes in Auto or Manual Mode.

The K200D utilizes a 2.7" LCD screen with a total pixel count of 230,000.

Type	Sensor	Class	2003	2004	2005	2006		2007	2008	2009	2010	2011	2012	2013	2014	2015	2016	2017	2018	2019	2020	2021	2022	2023	2024	2025
DSLR	MF	Professional										645D				645Z										
DSLR	FF	Professional																K-1		K-1 II						
DSLR	APS-C	High-end															K-3 II						K-3 III			
DSLR	APS-C	High-end													K-3											
DSLR	APS-C	Advanced									K-7	K-5		K-5 II / K-5 IIs												
DSLR	APS-C	Advanced		*ist D			K10D		K20D									KP								
DSLR	APS-C	Midrange					K100D	100DS	K200D					K-30	K-50			K-70						KF		
DSLR	APS-C	Entry-level			*ist DS	*ist DS2						K-r			K-500	K-S2										
DSLR	APS-C	Entry-level			*ist DL	DL2	K110D			K-m/K2000	K-x					K-S1										
MILC	APS-C	K-mount											K-01													
MILC	1/1.7"	Q-mount													Q7											
MILC	1/1.7"	Q-mount														Q-S1										
MILC	1/2.3"	Q-mount											Q	Q10												
DSLR	Prototypes		MZ-D (2000); 645D Prototype (2006); AP 50th Anniv. (2007)																							
Type	Sensor	Class																								
Type	Sensor	Class	2003	2004	2005	2006		2007	2008	2009	2010	2011	2012	2013	2014	2015	2016	2017	2018	2019	2020	2021	2022	2023	2024	2025
