= Olympus C-740UZ =

C-740 Ultra Zoom
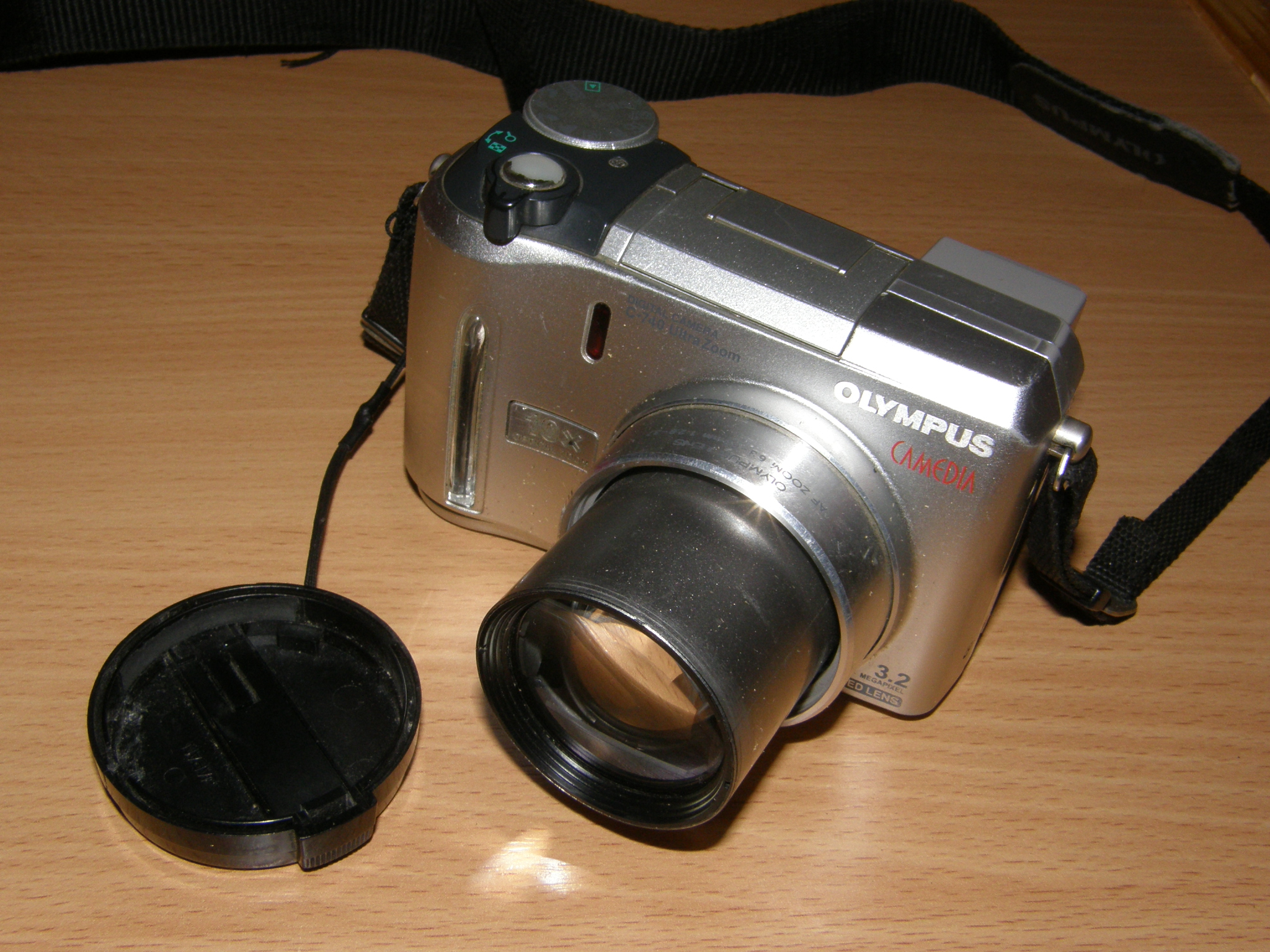

Overview
- Maker: Olympus Optical Co. Ltd.
- Type: Still image camera with motion capability

Lens
- Lens: Permanently attached 10X ED (extra-low dispersion) lens
- F-numbers: f2.8/f3.7 – f8

Sensor/medium
- Sensor type: Digital CCD (1/2.5" format)
- Sensor size: 3.2 effective Megapixel
- Recording medium: xD Picture Card, removable

Focusing
- Focus: Automatic, Manual

Shutter
- Shutter speeds: 1/1000 sec. – 16 sec.

The Olympus C-740UZ is a digital camera manufactured by Olympus. It was first released in 2003.

== Features and lens ==
The UZ in the camera's name refers to Ultra Zoom; 10 times zoom being a significant increase over the more standard three times zoom capability of standard digital cameras. The lens is an Olympus aspherical glass zoom lens 6.3 – 63mm (37.9-379mm equivalent for 35mm format). The 10x zoom is equivalent to 38-380mm in 35mm photography. The specifications describe it as 11 lenses in 7 groups.

== Flash ==
The camera has a built-in manual pop-up flash.

== Movies ==
Movies can be recorded without sound and the recording time is dependent on the xD card capacity. They are in QuickTime ( .mov) format.

== Power source ==
The camera can use AA batteries (4) including rechargeable batteries. Alternatively it can take two CR-V3 (LB-01) lithium or Li-Ion batteries.

== Image quality ==
Image quality issues noted in the review by Steves Digicams were "The overall image quality is quite good but it does exhibit some problems with chromatic aberration (purple fringing) of objects with strong backlighting. This is a problem with all of the "Ultra Zoom" cameras and seems to be very difficult to eliminate when coupling a CCD imager to a long 8x-10x telephoto zoom lens." The DCRP review noted however that "the extra-low dispersion (ED) lens noticeably reduces purple fringing ... . It doesn't eliminate it, but it's much better than [earlier models]."
