= Pentax K2000 =

Pentax K-m/K2000
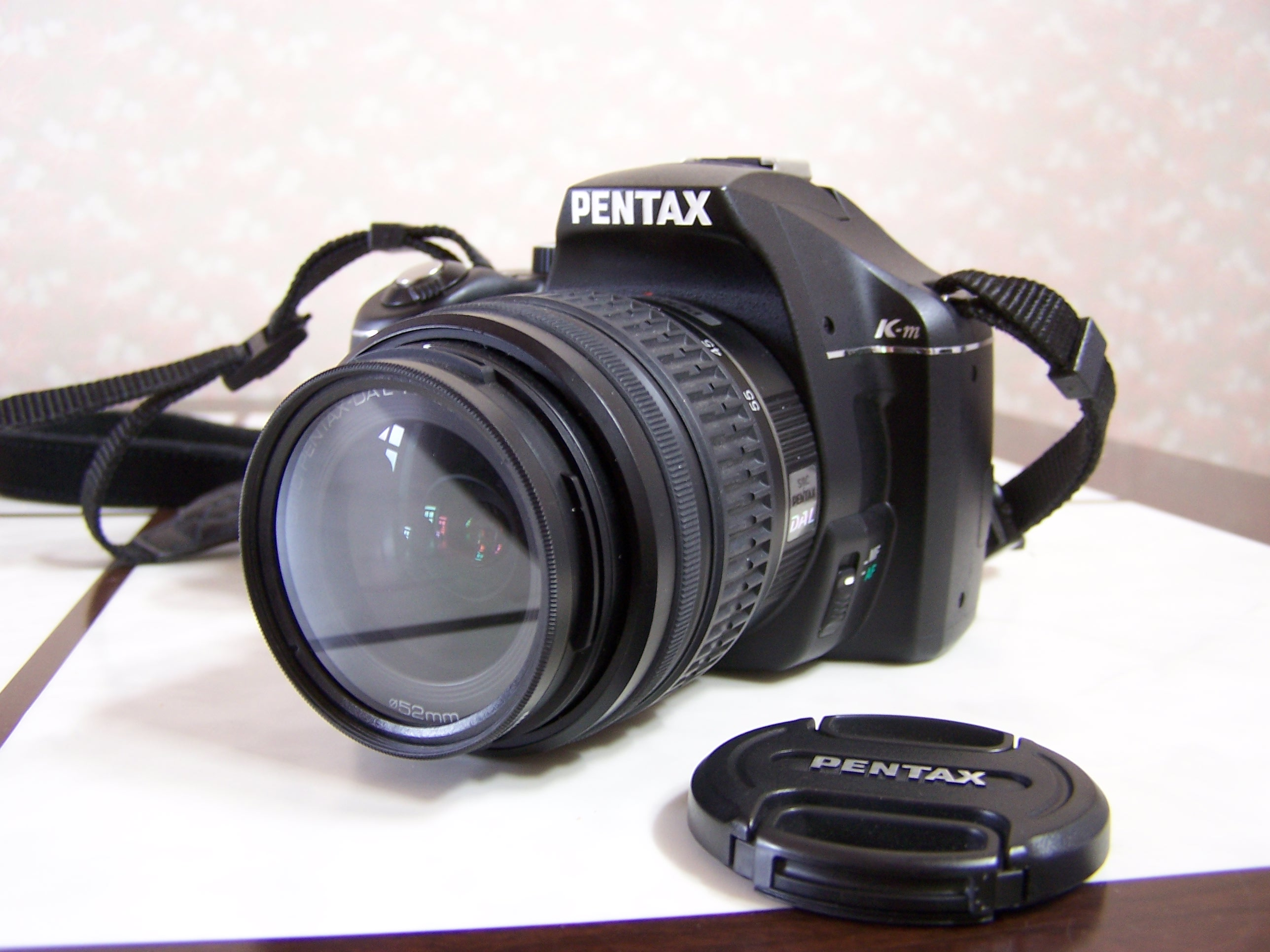
- Pentax K-M with DA-L 18-55mm lens and UV filter

Overview
- Maker: Pentax
- Type: digital single-lens reflex camera

Lens
- Lens: Interchangeable Pentax "crippled" K_{AF2} mount compatible with Pentax auto-aperture lenses and SDM lenses; older lenses supported in stop-down metering mode.

Sensor/medium
- Sensor: CCD image sensor with a primary color filter
- Maximum resolution: 10.2 megapixels
- Film speed: ISO Auto, ISO 100-3200 in 1 EV steps
- Storage media: SD, SDHC

Exposure/metering
- Exposure modes: Program, Shutter-Speed Priority, Aperture Priority, Manual, Bulb, Auto, Picture modes (Standard, Portrait, Landscape, Macro, Action, Night scene portrait, Standard flash-off)
- Exposure metering: TTL open-aperture metering with choice of: 16-segment, Center-weighted & Spot meter

Shutter
- Shutter speed range: 1/4000 sec – 30 sec, Bulb

Viewfinder
- Viewfinder: Eye-level pentamirror, 95% coverage, 0.85x magnification

General
- LCD screen: 2.7", 230,000 pixels
- Battery: AA (×4), Optional AC adapter
- Weight: 525 g (18.5 oz) without battery
- Made in: Philippines

The Pentax K-m (called K2000 in U.S.) is a 10.2 megapixel digital single-lens reflex camera, announced on September 22, 2008, at the 2008 photokina trade show along with the DA-L series of lightweight, inexpensive lenses. It was discontinued in November 2009, being replaced by the more recent Pentax K-x.

The K-m is considered a compact and entry-level model. It is significantly lighter than other Pentax DSLRs, lacks the weather sealing of the contemporaneous K200D and K20D models, and is intended to be sold with lightweight DA-L-series lenses. It does offer some improvements over the K200D, however, notably a maximum sensitivity increased from ISO 1600 to ISO 3200 and a slightly faster burst mode.

The MSRP of the Pentax K2000 is $699 with DA-L 18-55mm f/3.5-5.6 kit lens and AF200FG external flash unit.

== See also ==
- Pentax K1000
- Pentax K-x

Type	Sensor	Class	2003	2004	2005	2006		2007	2008	2009	2010	2011	2012	2013	2014	2015	2016	2017	2018	2019	2020	2021	2022	2023	2024	2025
DSLR	MF	Professional										645D				645Z										
DSLR	FF	Professional																K-1		K-1 II						
DSLR	APS-C	High-end															K-3 II						K-3 III			
DSLR	APS-C	High-end													K-3											
DSLR	APS-C	Advanced									K-7	K-5		K-5 II / K-5 IIs												
DSLR	APS-C	Advanced		*ist D			K10D		K20D									KP								
DSLR	APS-C	Midrange					K100D	100DS	K200D					K-30	K-50			K-70						KF		
DSLR	APS-C	Entry-level			*ist DS	*ist DS2						K-r			K-500	K-S2										
DSLR	APS-C	Entry-level			*ist DL	DL2	K110D			K-m/K2000	K-x					K-S1										
MILC	APS-C	K-mount											K-01													
MILC	1/1.7"	Q-mount													Q7											
MILC	1/1.7"	Q-mount														Q-S1										
MILC	1/2.3"	Q-mount											Q	Q10												
DSLR	Prototypes		MZ-D (2000); 645D Prototype (2006); AP 50th Anniv. (2007)																							
Type	Sensor	Class																								
Type	Sensor	Class	2003	2004	2005	2006		2007	2008	2009	2010	2011	2012	2013	2014	2015	2016	2017	2018	2019	2020	2021	2022	2023	2024	2025
