= Cutoff voltage =

Voltage at which a battery is considered fully discharged

In electronics, the cut-off voltage is the voltage at which a battery is considered fully discharged, beyond which further discharge could cause harm. Some electronic devices, such as cell phones, will automatically shut down when the cut-off voltage has been reached.

== Batteries ==
Discharge curve of an AA alkaline battery showing the amount of energy available when using different possible cutoff voltages. Under a constant-current discharge at 100mA, energy extracted from the battery is proportional to the area under the graph: energy extracted before reaching a 1.3V cutoff additional energy extracted before reaching a 1.1V cutoff additional energy extracted when fully draining to 0V

In batteries, the cut-off (final) voltage is the prescribed lower-limit voltage at which battery discharge is considered complete. The cut-off voltage is usually chosen so that the maximum useful capacity of the battery is achieved. The cut-off voltage is different from one battery to the other and it is highly dependent on the type of battery and the kind of service in which the battery is used. When testing the capacity of a NiMH or NiCd battery a cut-off voltage of 1.0 V per cell is normally used, whereas 0.9 V is normally used as the cut-off voltage of an alkaline cell. Devices that have too high cut-off voltages may stop operating while the battery still has significant capacity remaining.

=== Voltage cut-off in portable electronics ===
Some portable equipment does not fully utilise the low-end voltage spectrum of a battery. The power to the equipment cuts off before a relatively large portion of the battery life has been used.

A high cut-off voltage is more widespread than perhaps assumed. For example, a certain brand of mobile phone that is powered with a single-cell Lithium-ion battery cuts off at 3.3 V. The Li‑ion can be discharged to 3 V and lower; however, with a discharge to 3.3 V (at room temperature), about 92–98% of the capacity is used. Importantly, particularly in the case of lithium-ion batteries, which are used in the vast majority of portable electronics today, a voltage cut-off below 3.2 V can lead to chemical instability in the cell, with the result being a reduced battery lifetime. For this reason, electronics manufacturers tend to use higher cut-off voltages, removing the need for consumers to buy battery replacements before other failure mechanisms in a device take effect.

== See also ==
- Cut-off (electronics)
- Comparison of commercial battery types § Common characteristics - includes cutoff voltages for various battery chemistries
