= Hanwha Vision =

South Korean electronics and security camera company

Hanwha Vision Co., Ltd.
- Native name: 한화비전
- Type: Public
- Industry: Physical security Video surveillance
- Predecessor: Samsung Techwin
- Founded: 1977; 49 years ago (as Samsung Precision); 2015; 11 years ago (as Hanwha Techwin)
- Headquarters: 6, Pangyo-ro 319beon-gil, Bundang-gu, Seongnam-si, Gyeonggi-do, South Korea
- Area served: Worldwide
- Key people: Kichul Kim (CEO)
- Revenue: 529.8 billion ₩ (2020)
- Number of employees: 1,822 (2020)
- Parent: Hanwha Group
- Website: Official website in English; Official website in Korean

- Hanwha Vision
- Hangul: 한화비전
- Hanja: 韓華비전
- RR: Hanhwa bijeon
- MR: Hanhwa pijŏn

Hanwha Vision (Korean: 한화비전), founded as Samsung Techwin, is a video surveillance company. It is a subsidiary of Hanwha Group. The company employs 1,822 people and is headquartered in South Korea. Its total sales in 2020 were 529.8 billion South Korean won.

Before the acquisition by Hanwha, Techwin also developed and sold automation, aeronautics, and weapons technology products. These businesses have since been spun off into dedicated Hanwha subsidiaries – Hanwha Precision Machinery, Hanwha Aerospace, and Hanwha Land Systems.

== History ==
The company was founded as Samsung Precision in 1977, later renamed Samsung Techwin. Under Samsung, the company established a precision instrument laboratory in 1978, and started making cameras in 1979. In technical cooperation with General Electric, it started manufacturing jet engines for Korean aircraft in 1980. Manufacture of 155 mm (6.1 in) self-propelled artillery began in 1984.

It changed its name to Samsung Aerospace (SSA) in 1987 and started to make helicopters. It acquired Rollei, a German camera manufacturer, and Union Optics of Japan, a manufacturer of semiconductor equipment. In 1996 it developed the SB427 helicopter with Bell and began selling digital cameras branded as "Samsung Kenox" in 1997. The same year, it made the first KF-16 fighter jet in Korea.

It handed over the firm's aircraft business to Korea Aerospace Industries in 1999 and changed its name to Samsung Techwin in 2000.

It exported the K-9 155 mm self-propelled artillery to Turkey. In 2005, the company marked first place in Korean digital cameras market share and started a technical co-operation with Pentax.

Samsung Techwin directly entered the European and North American closed-circuit television/surveillance market in 2008 under its own name, featuring a line of true day/night cameras and digital video recorders (DVRs). In 2009, the company introduced a new series of digital IP-based cameras and network video recorders.

Samsung Techwin and its bigger sister company Samsung Electronics announced in October 2009 that in 2010 Samsung Electronics CCTV camera division would be unified with Samsung Techwin's CCTV camera division. In recent years both companies appeared on the CCTV market with lineups that shared some technological underpinnings but in many ways differed (including incompatible PTZ control protocols), and in many markets they were direct competitors with overlapping distribution channels. Although some earlier speculation existed in specialty literature that the new company would appear under the name Samsung Security, official announcement stated that the CCTV division from Samsung Electronics will be transferred to Samsung Techwin.

In February 2014, Samsung Techwin presented its new portfolio of IP cameras for vertical markets at the International Security, Safety and Fire Exhibition (SICUR).

In December 2014, Samsung Electronics announced the sale of its holding stake in its security division, Samsung Techwin, to South Korean conglomerate Hanwha Group.

On June 29, 2015, Hanwha completed the takeover and renamed it as Hanwha Techwin.

In 2017, Hanwha Techwin has spun off its SMT pick-and-place machine business as Hanwha Precision Machinery.

In 2018, Hanwha Techwin took part in the Korea International Boat Show 2018, which is one of Asia's top boat shows. Hanwha Techwin was the only global security corporation to participate at the marine leisure industry exhibition held in Goyang, South Korea at KINTEX. Hanwha Techwin exhibited the importance of safety at sea and demonstrated maritime security solutions.

In November 2020, a new app for system integrators was announced. The app can be run on mobile devices and can be downloaded from Google Play and Apple App Store. It makes verifying that all devices are installed more conveniently and creates a bill of materials to verify that an order has been fulfilled.

On July 2, 2021, Hanwha Techwin announces five new models of the P Series AI Cameras. The Hanwha P Series AI Camera are a model of security cameras with video analytic technology. This technology is capable of detecting objects, such as people, vehicles, license plates, and faces, as well as classifying objects into categories such as age groups, gender, and colour.

On March 1, 2023, Hanwha Techwin changed its name to Hanwha Vision.

== Products ==
- Surveillance: CCTV (Surveillance) systems, modules, Presenter, FRID, DVR, optical instruments, etc.

=== Former products ===
==== Defense Industries – transferred to Hanwha Defense ====
- K9 Thunder self-propelled artillery, K10 ammunition resupply vehicles, sub-systems for K2 Black Panther, sentry gun robot SGR-A1.

==== Aeronautics - transferred to Hanwha Aerospace ====
- Power Systems: Gas Turbines, Engines for helicopters, Refrigerant Compressors, Overhaul, etc.
- Transportations: Samsung Techwin operates a few helicopter routes inside South Korea.

==== Consumer electronics – transferred to Samsung Electronics ====
- Digital still cameras: Samsung Digimax line (e.g. Samsung Digimax A7)

== See also ==
- Hanwha
- Samsung
