= Comparison of commercial battery types =

This is a list of commercially available battery types summarizing some of their characteristics for ready comparison.

== Common characteristics ==
This table lists characteristics common to both single use (primary) and rechargeable (secondary) batteries.

| Cell chemistry | Also known as | Electrode | | | Rechargeable | Commercialized | Voltage | | | Energy density | | Specific power | Cost^{†} | Self-discharge rate | Shelf life |
| Cell chemistry | Also known as | Anode | Electrolyte | Cathode | Rechargeable | Commercialized | Cutoff | Nominal | 100% SOC | by mass | by volume | Specific power | Cost^{†} | Self-discharge rate | Shelf life |
| Cell chemistry | Also known as | Anode | Electrolyte | Cathode | Rechargeable | year | V | V | V | MJ/kg (Wh/kg) | MJ/L (Wh/L) | W/kg | Wh/$ ($/kWh) | %/month | years |
|---|---|---|---|---|---|---|---|---|---|---|---|---|---|---|---|
| Lead–acid | SLA; VRLA; PbAc | Lead | H_{2}SO_{4} | Lead dioxide | Yes | 1881 | 1.75 | 2.1 | 2.23–2.32 | 0.11–0.18 (30–50) | 0.22–0.27 (60–75) | 80-200 | 5.15–13.24 (76–194) | 3–20 | |
| Zinc–carbon | Carbon–zinc | Zinc | NH_{4}Cl | Manganese (IV) oxide | No | 1898 | 0.75–0.9 | 1.5 | | 0.13 (36) | 0.33 (92) | 10–27 | 2.35 (425) | 0.32 | 3–5 |
| Zinc–air | PR | Zinc | KOH | Oxygen | No | 1932 | 0.9 | 1.45–1.65 | | 1.59 (442) | 6.02 (1,673) | 100 | 2.06 (486) | 0.17 | 3 |
| Mercury oxide–zinc | Mercuric oxide Mercury cell | Zinc | NaOH/ KOH | Mercuric oxide | No | 1942– 1996 | 0.9 | 1.35 | | 0.36–0.44 (99–123) | 1.1–1.8 (300–500) | | | | 2 |
| Alkaline | Zn/MnO_{2} LR | Zinc | KOH | Manganese (IV) oxide | No | 1949 | 0.9 | 1.5 | 1.6 | 0.31–0.68 (85–190) | 0.90–1.56 (250–434) | 50 | 44.12 (23) | 0.17 | 5–10 |
| Rechargeable alkaline | RAM | Zinc | KOH | Manganese (IV) oxide | Yes | 1992 | 0.9 | 1.57 | 1.6 | | | | | <1 | |
| Silver-oxide | SR | Zinc | NaOH/ KOH | Silver oxide | No | 1960 | 1.2 | 1.55 | 1.6 | 0.47 (130) | 1.8 (500) | | | | |
| Nickel–zinc | NiZn | Zinc | KOH | Nickel oxide hydroxide | Yes | 2009 | 0.9 | 1.65 | 1.85 | | | | | 13 | |
| Nickel–iron | NiFe | Iron | KOH | Nickel oxide hydroxide | Yes | 1901 | 0.75 | 1.2 | 1.65 | 0.07–0.09 (19–25) | 0.45 (125) | 100 | 3.13–4.17 (240–319) | 20–30 | 30– 50 |
| Nickel–cadmium | NiCd; NiCad | Cadmium | KOH | Nickel oxide hydroxide | Yes | c. 1960 | 0.9–1.05 | 1.2 | 1.3 | 0.11 (30) | 0.36 (100) | 150–200 | | 10 | |
| Nickel–hydrogen | NiH_{2} Ni-H_{2} | Hydrogen | KOH | Nickel oxide hydroxide | Yes | 1975 | 1.0 | 1.55 | | 0.16–0.23 (45–65) | 0.22 (60) | 150–200 | | | 5 |
| Nickel–metal hydride | NiMH; Ni-MH | Metal hydride | KOH | Nickel oxide hydroxide | Yes | 1990 | 0.9–1.05 | 1.2 | 1.3 | 0.36 (100) | 1.44 (401) | 250–1,000 | 2.5 (399) | 30 | |
| Low self-discharge nickel–metal hydride | LSD NiMH | Metal hydride | KOH | Nickel oxide hydroxide | Yes | 2005 | 0.9–1.05 | 1.2 | 1.3 | 0.34 (95) | 1.27 (353) | 250–1,000 | | 0.42 | |
| Lithium–manganese dioxide | Lithium; Li-MnO_{2} CR; Li-Mn | Lithium | | Manganese dioxide | No | 1976 | 2 | 3 | | 0.54–1.19 (150–330) | 1.1–2.6 (300–710) | 250–400 | | 1 | 5–10 |
| Lithium–carbon monofluoride | Li-(CF)_{x} BR | Lithium | | Carbon monofluoride | No | 1976 | 2 | 3 | | 0.94–2.81 (260–780) | 1.58–5.32 (440–1,478) | 50–80 | | 0.2–0.3 | 15 |
| Lithium–iron disulfide | Li-FeS_{2} FR | Lithium | | Iron disulfide | No | 1989 | 0.9 | 1.5 | 1.8 | 1.07 (297) | 2.1 (580) | | | | 10-20 |
| Lithium–titanate | Li_{4}Ti_{5}O_{12} LTO | Lithium | | Lithium manganese oxide or Lithium nickel manganese cobalt oxide | Yes | 2008 | 1.6–1.8 | 2.3–2.4 | 2.8 | 0.22–0.40 (60–110) | 0.64 (177) | 3,000– 5,100 | 0.37 (2683) | 2–5 | 10–20 |
| Lithium cobalt oxide | LiCoO_{2} ICR; LCO; Li‑cobalt | Graphite^{‡} | LiPF_{6}/ LiBF_{4}/ LiClO_{4} | Lithium cobalt oxide | Yes | 1991 | 2.5 | 3.7 | 4.2 | 0.70 (195) | 2.0 (560) | | 2.09 (479) | | |
| Lithium iron phosphate | LiFePO_{4} IFR; LFP; Li‑phosphate | Graphite^{‡} | | Lithium iron phosphate | Yes | 1996 | 2 | 3.2 | 3.65 | 0.32–0.62 (90–172) | 1.43 (396) | 200–1,200 | 7.2 (139) | 4.5 | 20 years |
| Lithium manganese oxide | LiMn_{2}O_{4} IMR; LMO; Li‑manganese | Graphite^{‡} | | Lithium manganese oxide | Yes | 1999 | 2.5 | 3.9 | 4.2 | 0.54 (150) | 1.5 (420) | | 2.09 (479) | | |
| Lithium nickel cobalt aluminium oxides | LiNiCoAlO_{2} NCA; NCR; Li‑aluminium | Graphite^{‡} | | Lithium nickel cobalt aluminium oxide | Yes | 1999 | 3.0 | 3.6 | 4.3 | 0.79 (220) | 2.2 (600) | | | | |
| Lithium nickel manganese cobalt oxide | LiNi_{x}Mn_{y}Co_{1-x-y}O_{2} INR; NMC; NCM | Graphite^{‡} | | Lithium nickel manganese cobalt oxide | Yes | 2008 | 2.5 | 3.6 | 4.2 | 0.74 (205) | 2.1 (580) | | | | |

^† Cost in inflation-adjusted 2025 USD.

^‡ Typical. See Lithium-ion battery § Negative electrode for alternative electrode materials.

== Rechargeable characteristics ==
This is a table of characteristics common to rechargeable batteries.

Cycle life can be significantly affected by factors such as the ambient temperature and charge/discharge rate. For the purposes of this table, typical conditions are assumed.

| Cell chemistry | Round-trip efficiency | Cycle durability at varying depth of discharge (DoD) cycles | | | |
| Cell chemistry | % | 100% DoD | 70-90% DoD | 40-60% DoD | <40% DoD |
|---|---|---|---|---|---|
| Lead–acid | 50–92 | 50–100 | 150–250 @ 70% DoD | 300–500 @ 50% DoD | >800 @ 30% DoD |
| Rechargeable alkaline | | 5–100 | | | |
| Nickel–zinc | | 100 to 50% capacity | | | |
| Nickel–iron | 65–80 | 5,000 | | | |
| Nickel–cadmium | 70–90 | 500 | | | |
| Nickel–hydrogen | 85 | 20,000 | | | |
| Nickel–metal hydride | 66 | 300–800 | | | |
| Low self-discharge nickel–metal hydride battery | | 500–1,500 | | | |
| Lithium cobalt oxide | 90 | 500–1,000 | | | |
| Lithium–titanate | 85–90 | >13,000 | ≫20,000 @ 80% DoD | >60,000 @ 60% DoD | |
| Lithium iron phosphate | 90 | | ≥2,000 @ 80% DoD | 3,500–>9,000 @ 50% DoD | >10,000 @ 20% DoD |
| Lithium manganese oxide | 90 | 300–700 | | | |

== Thermal runaway ==
Under certain conditions, some battery chemistries are at risk of thermal runaway, leading to cell rupture or combustion. As thermal runaway is determined not only by cell chemistry but also cell size, cell design and charge, only the worst-case values are reflected here.

| Cell chemistry | Overcharge | Overheat | | |
| Cell chemistry | Onset | Onset | Runaway | Peak |
| Cell chemistry | SOC% | °C | °C | °C/min |
|---|---|---|---|---|
| Lithium cobalt oxide | 150 | 165 | 190 | 440 |
| Lithium iron phosphate | 100 | 220 | 240 | 21 |
| Lithium manganese oxide | 110 | 210 | 240 | 100+ |
| Lithium nickel cobalt aluminium oxide | 125 | 140 | 195 | 260 |
| Lithium nickel manganese cobalt oxide | 170 | 160 | 230 | 100+ |

== See also ==
- Battery nomenclature
- Experimental rechargeable battery types
- Aluminium battery
- List of battery sizes
- List of battery types
- Search for the Super Battery (2017 PBS film)
