= CR-V3 battery =

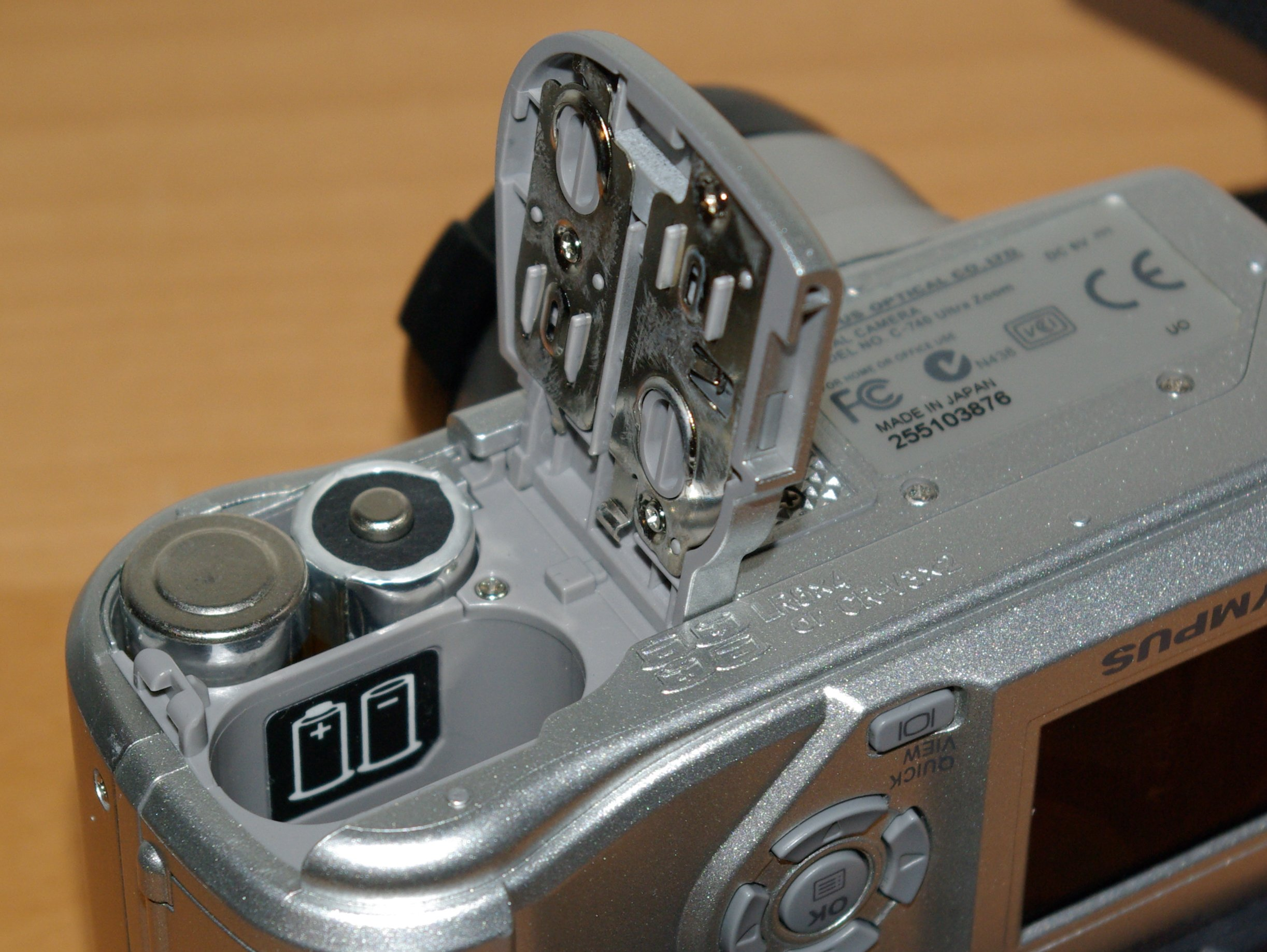
The battery compartment of this camera is designed to accept four AA cells or two CR-V3 batteries.

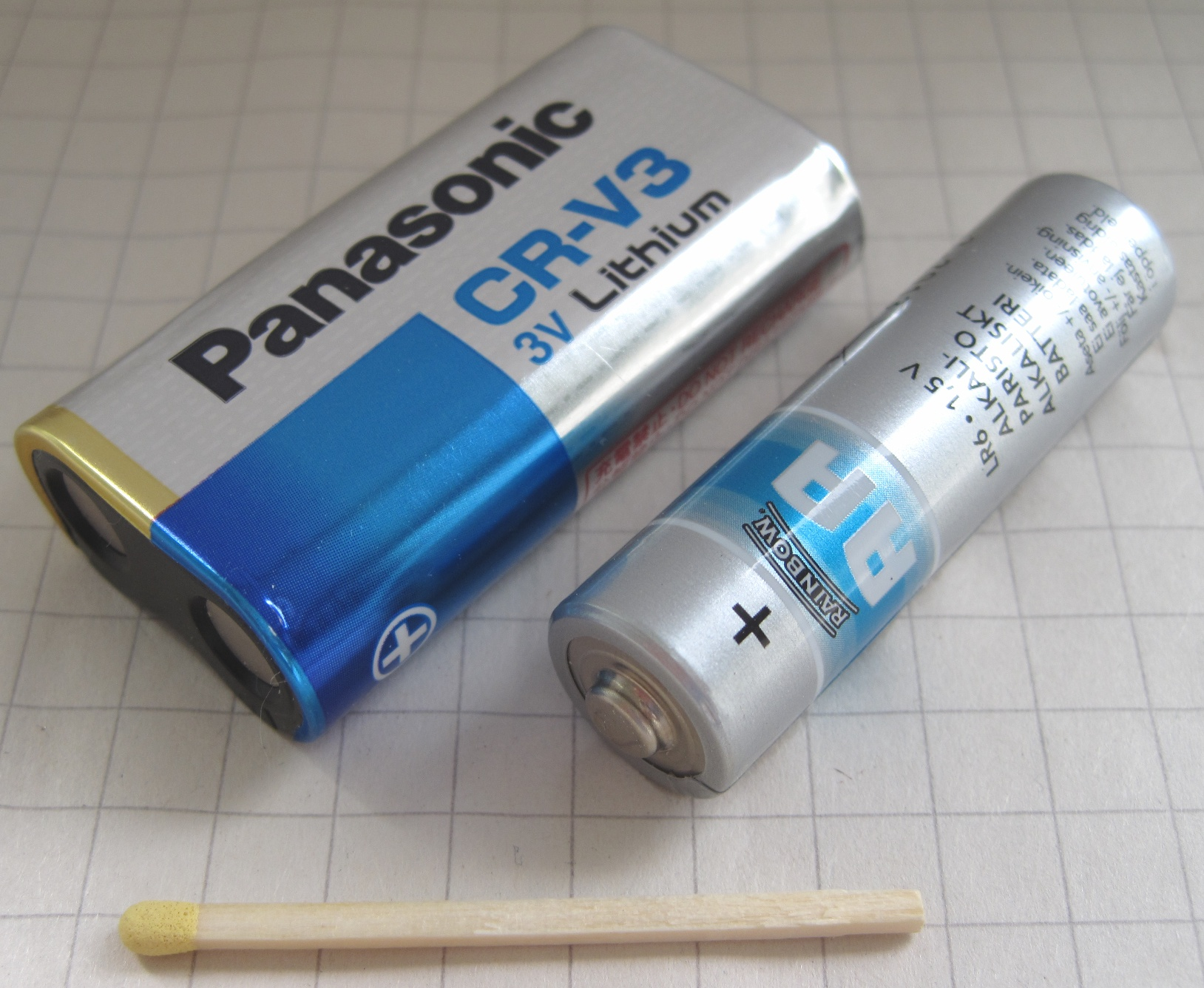
A CR-V3 battery with matchstick and AA battery for comparison

A CR-V3 battery (sometimes CRV3) is a type of disposable high-capacity 3-volt battery used in various electronic appliances, including some digital cameras. It has the shape and size of two side-by-side AA batteries. This allows CR-V3 batteries to function in many (though not all) devices originally designed for only AA batteries. An RCR-V3 battery is a rechargeable 3.7 V lithium-ion battery.

== Disposable CR-V3 batteries ==
Often, a CR-V3 battery is a single cell based on a non-rechargeable lithium battery chemistry, with a nominal voltage of 3 V (the same as two alkaline AA batteries). Duracell Ultra CR-V3 is composed of two 3 V AA sized lithium cells connected in parallel. Because both lithium and lithium-ion chemistries offer higher energy density than NiMH rechargeable batteries or even alkaline batteries, a CR-V3 battery is designed to last much longer than a pair of AA batteries. Some more recent CR-V3 batteries are composed of 2 lithium AA rechargeable batteries.

== Rechargeable RCR-V3 batteries ==
Rechargeable lithium-ion RCR-V3 batteries, with a nominal voltage of 3.7 V, are also available. Some have a third smaller terminal used for charging and may not be compatible with chargers from different manufacturers.

== See also ==
- AA battery
- Battery recycling
