= AA battery =

Standard size of cylindrical dry battery

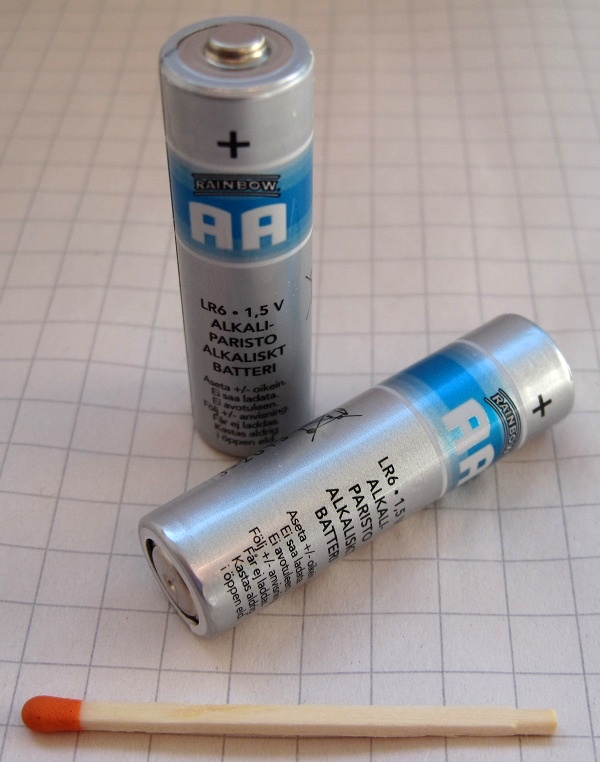
AA cells, match for size comparison.

The AA battery (or double-A battery) is a standard-size of cylindrical dry battery. They are one of the most common types of interchangeable batteries in portable electronic devices. An AA battery is composed of a single electrochemical cell that may be either a primary battery (disposable) or a rechargeable battery. In the most common standard battery sizes, AA sits between the smaller AAA battery and the larger C battery.

Several different chemistries are used in their construction, most commonly alkaline, zinc–carbon, lithium iron disulfide, and nickel–metal hydride. The exact terminal voltage, capacity and practical discharge rates depend on cell chemistry; however, devices designed for AA cells will usually only take 1.2–1.5 V, unless specified by the manufacturer.

== Designations ==
ANSI and IEC battery nomenclature gives several designations for cells in this size, depending on cell features and chemistry. The IEC 60086 system calls the size R6, and ANSI C18 calls it 15. It is named UM-3 by JIS of Japan. Historically, it is known as D14 (hearing-aid battery), U12 – later U7 (standard cell), or HP7 (for zinc-chloride "high power" version) in official documentation in the United Kingdom, or a pen cell.

== History ==
Introduced in 1907 by The American Ever Ready Company, the AA battery size was standardized by the American National Standards Institute (ANSI) in 1947, but it had been in use in torches (flashlights) and electrical novelties before formal standardization.

== Dimensions ==
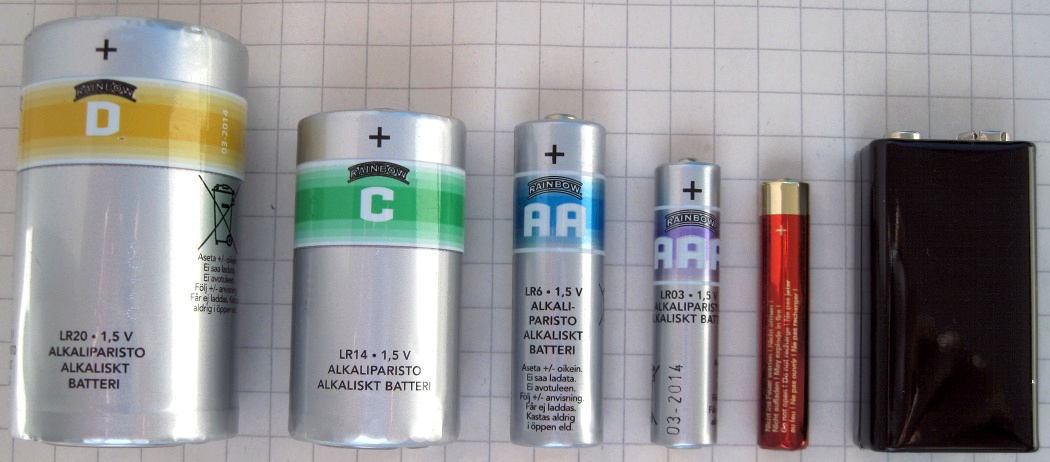
D, C, AA, AAA, AAAA cells, and a 9-volt battery

An AA cell measures 49.5–50.5 mm (1.95–1.99 in) in length, including the button terminal—and 13.7–14.5 mm (0.54–0.57 in) in diameter. The positive terminal button should be a minimum 1 mm high and a maximum 5.5 mm in diameter, the flat negative terminal should be a minimum diameter of 7 mm and carry a maximum indent of 0.5 mm.

Alkaline AA cells have a weight of roughly 23 g (0.81 oz), lithium AA cells around 15 g (0.53 oz), and rechargeable Ni-MH cells around 31 g (1.1 oz).

== Chemistry and capacity ==
=== Primary cells ===
Primary (non-rechargeable) zinc–carbon (dry cell) AA batteries have around 400–900 milliampere hours capacity, with measured capacity highly dependent on test conditions, duty cycle, and cut-off voltage. Zinc–carbon batteries are usually marketed as "general purpose" batteries. Zinc-chloride batteries which store around 1,000 to 1,500 mAh are often sold as "heavy duty" or "super heavy duty". Alkaline batteries from 1,700 mAh to 2,850 mAh cost more than zinc-chloride batteries, but hold additional charge. AA size alkaline batteries are termed as LR6 by IEC, and AM-3 by JIS.

Non-rechargeable lithium iron disulfide batteries are manufactured for devices that draw more current, such as digital cameras, where their high cost is offset by longer running time between battery changes and more constant voltage during discharge. The capacity of alkaline batteries is greatly reduced as the discharge current increases, however the capacity of a Li-FeS2 battery is not affected by high discharge currents nearly as much as alkaline batteries. Another advantage of lithium disulfide batteries compared to alkaline batteries is that they are less prone to leak. This is particularly important in expensive equipment, where a leaking alkaline battery can damage the equipment due to the corrosive electrolyte coming into contact with sensitive electronics. Lithium iron disulfide batteries are intended for use in equipment compatible with alkaline zinc batteries. Lithium-iron disulfide batteries can have an open-circuit voltage as high as 1.8 volts, but the closed-circuit voltage decreases, making this chemistry compatible with equipment intended for zinc-based batteries. A fresh alkaline zinc battery can have an open-circuit voltage of 1.6 volts, but a lithium iron disulfide battery with an open-circuit voltage below 1.7 volts is entirely discharged.

=== Rechargeable cells ===
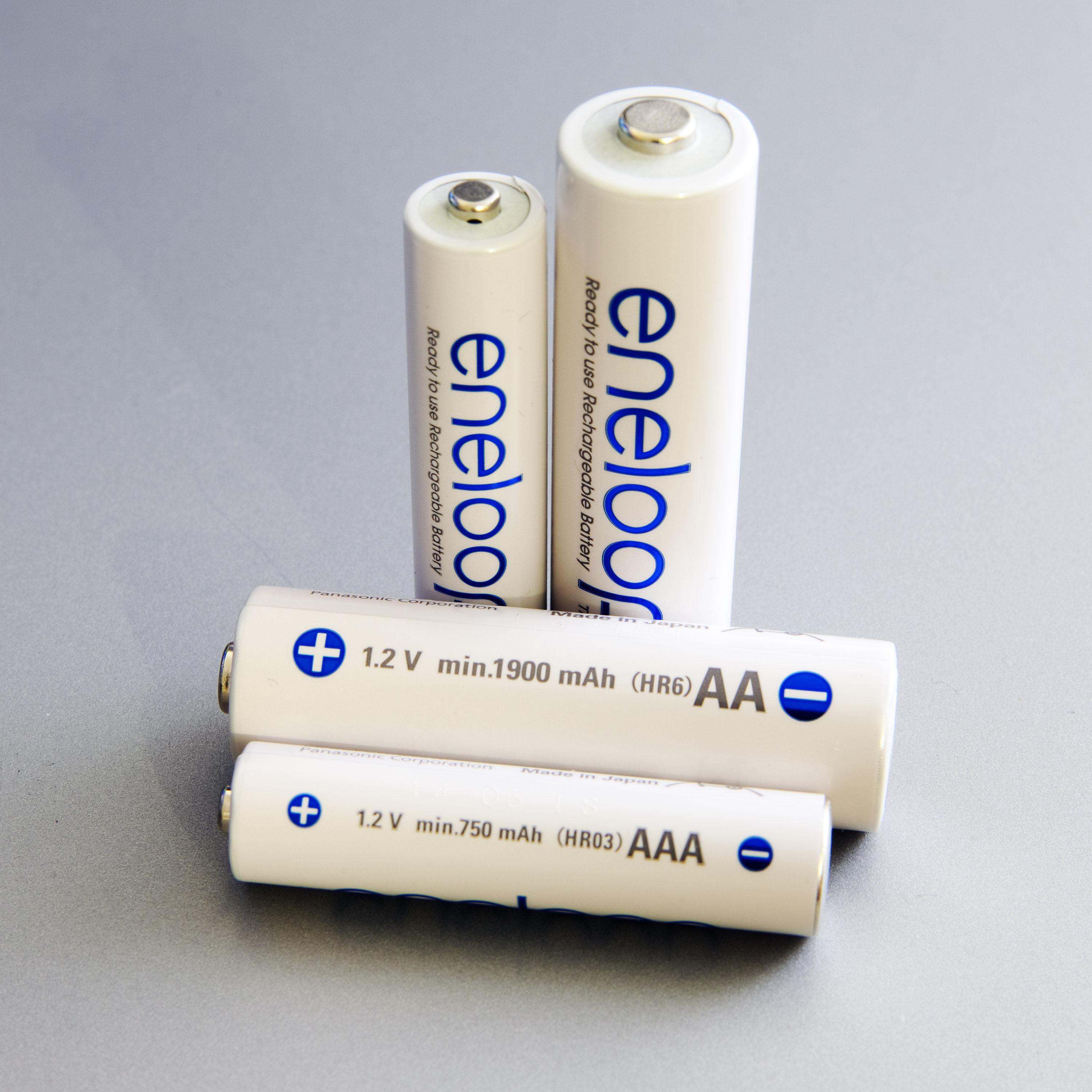
Panasonic Eneloop 1.2 volt NiMH rechargeable cells in AA and AAA

Rechargeable batteries in the AA size are available in multiple chemistries: nickel–cadmium (NiCd) with a capacity of roughly 600–1,000 mAh, nickel–metal hydride (NiMH) in various capacities of 600–2,750 mAh and lithium-ion. NiCd and NiMH provide 1.2 V; lithium-ion chemistry has a nominal voltage of 3.6–3.7 volts, and AA-sized cells of this voltage are coded 14500 rather than AA. AA-sized lithium-ion cells with circuitry to reduce the voltage to the 1.5V of standard replaceable cells are also made.

NiMH and lithium-ion AA/14500 cells can supply most of their capacity even when under a high current drain (0.5A and higher), unlike alkaline and zinc-chloride ("Heavy Duty"/"Super Heavy Duty") cells which drop to a small fraction of their low current capacity before even reaching 1 C.

A Li-ion 1.5V AA-size battery, sold by the Chinese company Kentli as "Kentli PH5" since 2014 (with similar batteries later available from other suppliers), is a AA-sized battery housing containing a rechargeable 3.7 V Li-ion cell with an internal buck converter at the positive terminal to reduce the output voltage to 1.5 V. The Kentli batteries expose the normal 3.7 V Li-ion electrode in a ring around the AA electrode to allow charging by a special charger. It supplies the same 1.5 V as a fresh disposable alkaline AA cell, but with virtually no drop over the discharge cycle, unlike other disposable or rechargeable cells. Its lithium-ion chemistry provides a low self-discharge of 3% per month. Its capacity at 250 mA drain is 1,700 mAh at 1.5 V, less than other chemistries, limited by the low efficiency of the step-down converter. Some later Li-ion AA batteries advertise their energy in milliwatt-hours (mWh) instead of the usual capacity in milliampere-hours (mAh), so a customer's attention is drawn to the figure, typically a claimed 3,000 or more, which is in reality 2,000 mAh.

By 2023, several brands of 1.5 V Li-ion rechargeable batteries in both AA and AAA sizes (with voltage converting circuitry in even the small AAA casing) were available. They use various charging methods, without the special Kentli ring third electrode. Some have special chargers—a charger for a 1.2 V cell will not provide sufficient voltage—but do not use a third electrode. Others have a USB port built into the cell itself.

Nickel-zinc cell (NiZn) rechargeable 1.65 V AA and AAA cells are also available, but not widely used. They require a charging circuit capable of supplying that voltage.

=== Comparison ===
Chemistry	IEC name	ANSI/NEDA name	Nominal voltage (V)	Capacity under 50 mA constant drain (mAh)	Max. energy at nominal voltage and 50 mA drain (Wh)	Rechargeable
Zinc–carbon	R6	15D	1.50	400–1,700	2.55	No
Alkaline	LR6	15A	1.50	1,800–2,850	3.90	Some
Li-FeS_{2}	FR6	15LF	1.50	2,700–3,400	5.10	No
Li-ion	??R15/50	14500	3.60–3.70	600–1,500	5.4	Yes
LiFePO4		14500	3.2–3.3	600–1,000+	2.80	Yes
NiCd	KR6	15K	1.20	600–1,000	1.20	Yes
NiMH	HR6	15H	1.20	600–2,750	3.42	Yes
NiZn	ZR6	?	1.60–1.65	1,500–1,800	2.97	Yes

== Use ==
In 2011, AA cells accounted for approximately 60% of alkaline battery sales in the United States. In Japan, 58% of alkaline batteries sold were AA, known in that country as tansan (単三). In Switzerland, AA batteries totaled 55% in both primary and secondary (rechargeable) battery sales.

== Bounce test ==
In zinc alkaline AA batteries, a zinc gel slowly turns into a ceramic as power is consumed. This means that fully charged batteries do not bounce when dropped onto a hard surface, but fully discharged batteries do. Because the transition occurs gradually and non-linearly, a bounce does not mean that a battery is fully depleted, but a non-bounce does mean it has charge left. Researchers at Princeton University produced a video showing bounce height with each 10% of discharge.

== See also ==
- List of battery sizes
- Battery nomenclature
