= Nine-volt battery =

Form of electric battery

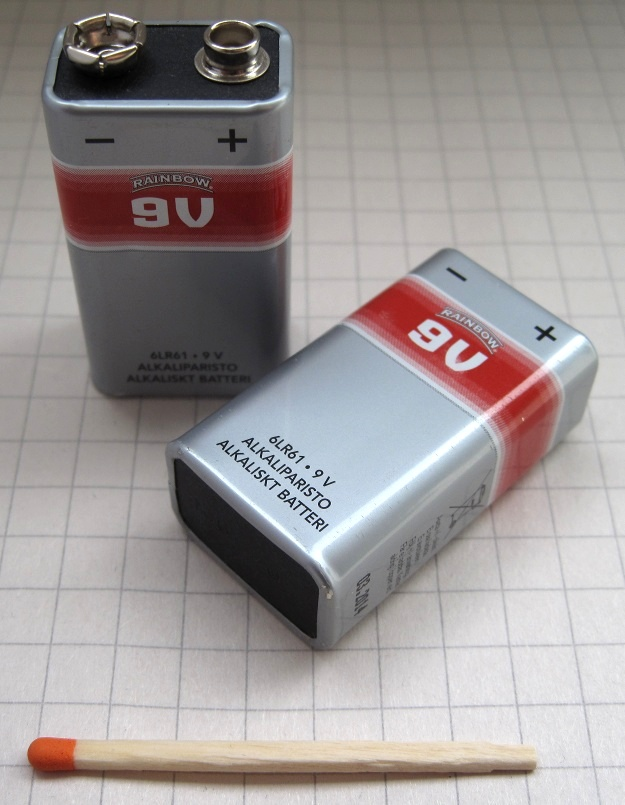
Two 9-volt batteries made of alkaline chemistry in the most common size (PP3), along with a match for comparison.

The nine-volt battery, or 9-volt battery, is an electric battery that supplies a nominal voltage of 9 volts. Actual voltage measures 7.2 to 9.6 volts, depending on battery chemistry. Batteries of various sizes and capacities are manufactured; a very common size is known as PP3 (IEC alkaline 6LR61), introduced for early transistor radios. The PP3 has a cuboid shape with rounded edges and two polarized snap connectors on the top. This type is commonly used for many applications including household uses such as smoke detectors, gas detectors, clocks, and toys.

The nine-volt PP3-size battery is commonly available in primary zinc–carbon and alkaline chemistry, in primary lithium iron disulfide and lithium manganese dioxide (sometimes designated CRV9), and in rechargeable form in nickel–cadmium (Ni–Cd), nickel–metal hydride (Ni–MH) and lithium-ion. Mercury batteries of this format, once common, have been banned in many countries due to their toxicity. Designations for this format include NEDA 1604 and IEC 6F22 (for zinc-carbon) or MN1604 6LR61 (for alkaline). The size, regardless of chemistry, is commonly designated PP3—a designation originally reserved solely for carbon-zinc, or in some countries, E or E-block. A range of PP batteries was produced in the past, with voltages of 4.5, 6, and 9 volts and different capacities; the larger 9-volt PP6, PP7, and PP9 are still available. A few other 9-volt battery sizes are available: A10 and A29.

Most PP3-size alkaline batteries are constructed of six individual cylindrical 1.5 V LR61 cells enclosed in a wrapper. These cells are slightly smaller than LR8D425 AAAA cells and can be used in their place for some devices, even though they are 3.5 mm shorter. Carbon-zinc types are made with six flat cells in a stack, enclosed in a moisture-resistant wrapper to prevent drying. Primary lithium types are made with three cells in series.

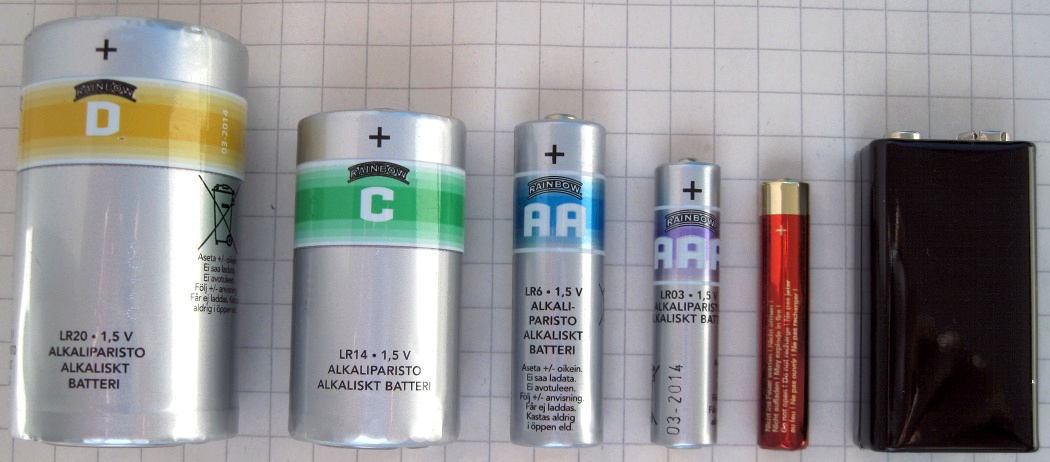
Size comparison of batteries: D, C, AA, AAA, AAAA, 9-volt (PP3)

9-volt batteries accounted for 4% of alkaline primary battery sales in the United States in 2007, and 2% of primary battery sales and 2% of secondary (rechargeable) battery sales in Switzerland in 2008.

== History ==
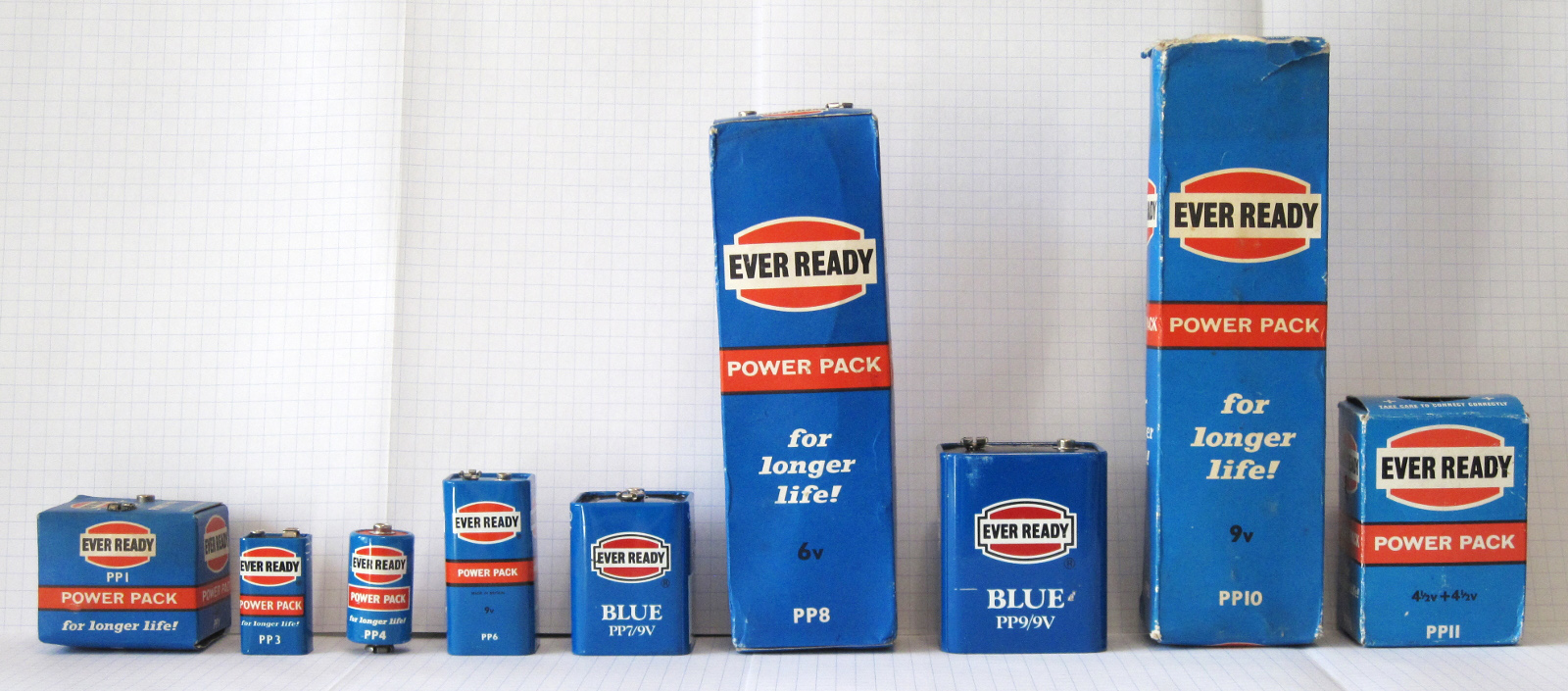
PP (power pack) battery family from left to right: PP1, PP3, PP4, PP6, PP7, PP8, PP9, PP10, PP11

Historically, the now-popular PP3 battery size was a member of the power pack (PP) battery family that was originally manufactured by Ever Ready in the United Kingdom and Eveready in the United States. The company says that it introduced the PP3 battery in 1956. In the 1940s, 1950s, and 1960s, they were commonly marketed as transistor radio batteries, or TR for short (meant to emulate the function of the old B battery). The PP3 battery was added as an ANSI standard in 1959, currently known as ANSI-1604A.

Power pack (PP) battery family
Name	Voltage	Capacity	Depth	Width	Height
PP1	6 volt	4 Ah	55.6 mm	65.1 mm	55.6 mm
PP3	9 volt	0.5 Ah	17.5 mm	26.5 mm	48.5 mm
PP4	9 volt	0.9 Ah	Dia. 25.8 mm, length: 49.8 mm; 41.5 mm ex. contacts		
PP5	9 volt	0.2 Ah	16 mm	15 mm	47.5 mm
PP6	9 volt	1 Ah	34.1 mm	35.7 mm	69.9 mm
PP7	9 volt	2.5 Ah	46 mm	46 mm	63 mm
PP8	6 volt	15 Ah	55 mm	61 mm	200 mm
PP8/2	6 Volt	45 Ah	63 mm	98 mm	200 mm
PP9	9 volt	5 Ah	51.5 mm	65 mm	80 mm
PP10	9 volt	15 Ah	66 mm	65 mm	267 mm
PP11	4.5 volt × 2	5 Ah	51.5 mm	65 mm	91 mm

The PP11 consists of two isolated 4.5-volt batteries with four terminals.

Only the PP1, PP3, PP6, PP7, PP8/2, and PP9 sizes are still manufactured, with the PP3 being extremely common. Modern batteries have higher capacities and lower internal resistances than early versions.

Before the mid-1950s, in the days of vacuum tube (valve) radios used batteries designed specifically for vacuum tubes, there was a nine-volt grid bias battery or (US) "C" battery, which had taps for various voltages from 1.5 to 9 volts.

Early transistorized radios and other equipment needed a suitable voltage miniature battery. Early transistor radios required a 22 1/2-volt battery. Although the transistors would theoretically operate from lower voltages, the point-contact transistors used in 1954 had to be operated very close to the collector-base junction voltage (V_{CBO}) limit in order to get the required frequency response. However, a suitable miniature battery was already marketed for (vacuum tube) hearing aids.

The PP3 (physically identical to 6LR61 and 1604A) appeared when portable transistor radios became common, and was referred to as a transistor battery or transistor-radio battery.

== PP3 connectors ==
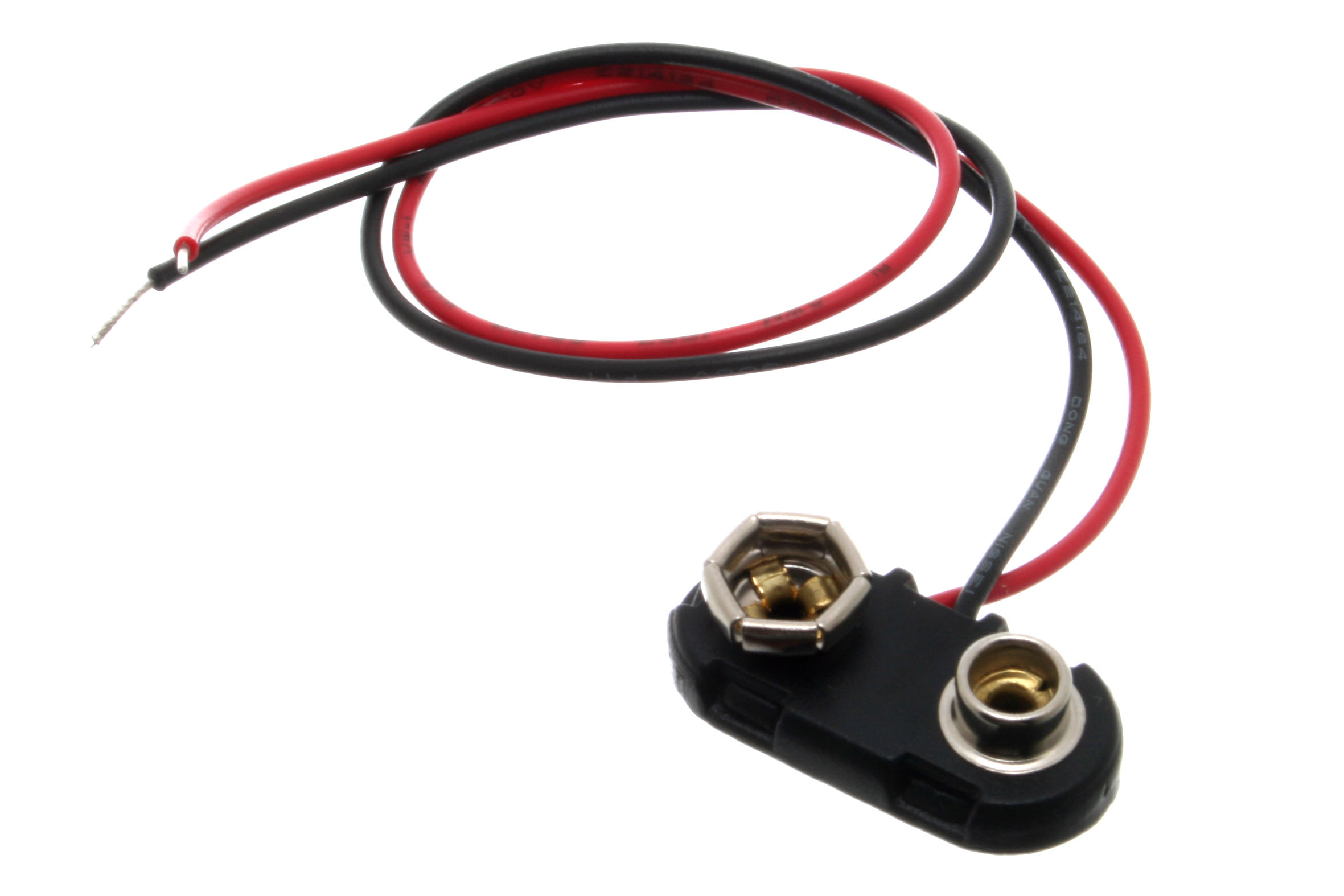
Nine-volt battery snap

The PP3 battery has both terminals in a snap connector on one end. The smaller circular (male) terminal is positive, and the larger hexagonal or octagonal (female) terminal is the negative contact. The connectors on the battery are the same as on the load device; the smaller one connects to the larger one. The same snap-style connector is used on other battery types in the PP series. Battery polarization is normally obvious, since mechanical connection is usually only possible in one configuration.

A problem with this type of connector is that two loose batteries with terminals exposed can touch and short circuit, discharging them, and generating heat and possibly a fire. Keeping nine-volt batteries in their packaging until use helps to avoid accidental discharge.

== Technical specifications ==
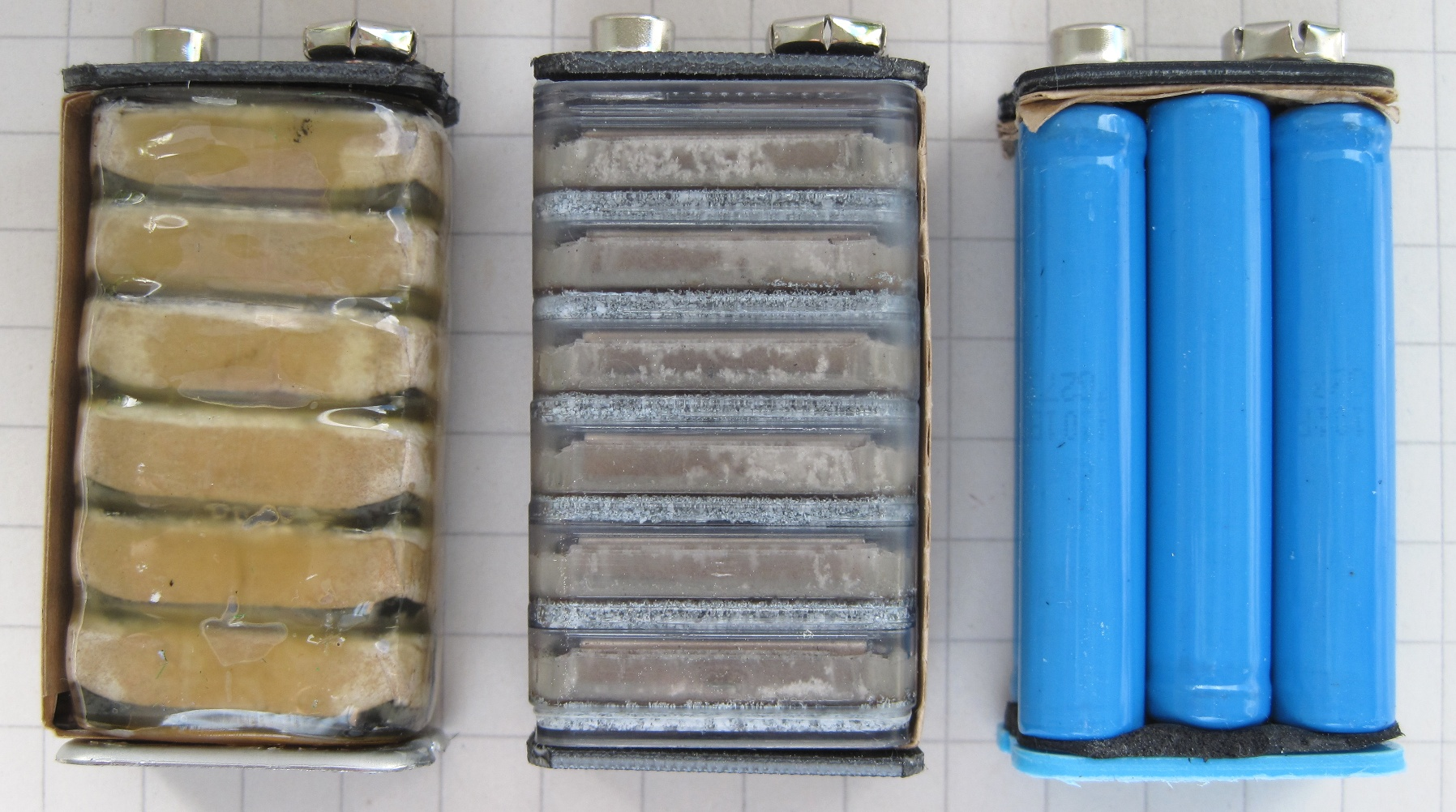
Three different kinds of 9-volt primary battery internals: rectangular cell zinc-carbon (6F22), rectangular cell alkaline (6LP3146), and cylindrical cell alkaline (6LR61)

Very often, a "9-volt" battery refers to the transistor radio size called PP3 or IEC 6F22 or NEDA 1604, although there are less common nine-volt batteries of different sizes.

Batteries of all types are manufactured in consumer and industrial grades. Costlier industrial-grade batteries may use chemistries that provide higher power-to-size ratio, have lower self-discharge and hence longer life when not in use, more resistance to leakage and, for example, ability to handle the high temperature and humidity associated with medical autoclave sterilization.

Type (Note: Some types are not found in a battery nomenclature, hence N/A.)		IEC name (Note: The granularity of IEC nomenclature means that each cell may have more than one match. This is partially due to the chemistry types being open to interpretation (especially for lithium cells) and partially due to the possibility of different geometric constructions (e.g. stacked versus cylinder). For example, the NiMH code listed in the table (6HR61) assumes a cylindrical geometry and would not apply to the pictured NiMH cell.)	ANSI/NEDA name	Typical capacity (mAh)	Typical capacity (Wh)	Nominal voltages
Primary (disposable)	Alkaline, six-cylinder	6LR61	1604A	550	4.95	9
Primary (disposable)	Alkaline, six-stack	6LP3146	1604A	550	4.95	9
Primary (disposable)	Zinc–carbon	6F22	1604D	400	3.6	9
Primary (disposable)	Lithium	(varies)	1604LC (Note: There is a similar issue in "lithium" being vague here. The example gives LC, the three-volt Li–MnO_{2} system. Alternatively six 1.6-volt Li–FeS_{2} cells may be used, giving 1604LF (or 6FR61 in IEC).)	1200	10.8	9
Rechargeable	Ni–Cd	6KR61	11604	120	0.864, 1.008	7.2, 8.4
Rechargeable	Ni–MH	6HR61	7.2H5	175–300	1.26-2.16, 1.47-2.52, 1.68-2.88,	7.2, 8.4, 9.6
Rechargeable	Lithium polymer	(varies)	—N/a	520	3.848	7.4
Rechargeable	Lithium-ion	(varies)	—N/a	620	4.588	7.4
Rechargeable	Lithium iron phosphate	—N/a	—N/a	200–320	1.92-3.072	9.6

== Testing ==
Testing a nine-volt battery can be done using a multi-meter by probing the voltage across the two terminals. The voltage measured by the multi-meter can then be used to roughly assess the charge of the battery.

If the positive and negative terminals of the battery are close enough, licking a nine-volt battery can be a quick test to check if a battery has any charge left. A tingling sensation can be felt across the tongue depending on the voltage of the battery; The higher the current flowing through the tongue the more intense the tingling sensation. Although largely safe, some people may find the tingling sensation unpleasant.

== Lithium ==
Lithium 9-volt batteries are rechargeable high-energy-density batteries. In the PP3 size they are typically rated at 0.8–1.2 Ah (e.g. >1.2 Ah @ 900 ohms to 5.4 V @ 23 °C for one type), about twice the capacity of alkaline batteries. Some manufacturers claim the energy density can be five times that of alkaline. Common applications for lithium nine-volt batteries are smoke and carbon monoxide detectors.

== See also ==
- Battery eliminator
- Battery nomenclature
- List of battery sizes
- List of battery types
- Self-discharge
