= AAAA battery =

Type of electric battery

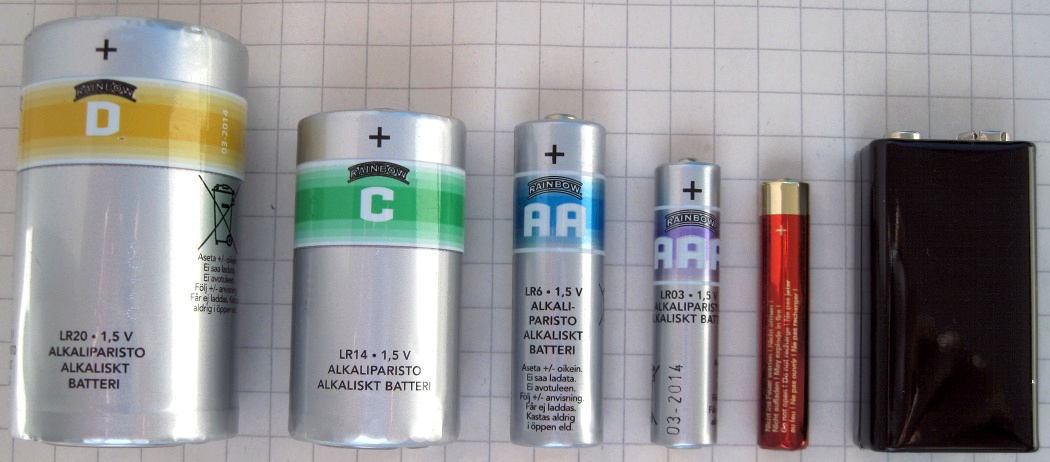
Left to right: D, C, AA, AAA, AAAA, and 9-volt batteries

The AAAA battery (or quadruple-A battery) is 42.5 mm long and 8.3 mm in diameter. The alkaline cell weighs around 6.5 g and produces 1.5 V. This size battery is also classified as R8D425 (IEC) and 25 (ANSI/NEDA). The alkaline battery in this size is also known by Duracell type number MN2500 or MX2500 and Energizer type number E96.

== Types ==
	Zinc–carbon	Alkaline	NiCd	NiMH	Li-ion
IEC name	R8D425	LR8D425	KR8D425	HR8D425	
ANSI/NEDA name	25D	25A			
Typical capacity	300 mAh	500–600 mAh		325–500 mAh	160–170 mAh
Nominal voltage	1.50 V	1.50 V	1.25 V	1.25 V	3.7 V
Nominal mWh	450 mWh	750–950 mWh		406–625 mWh	592–629 mWh

== Uses ==
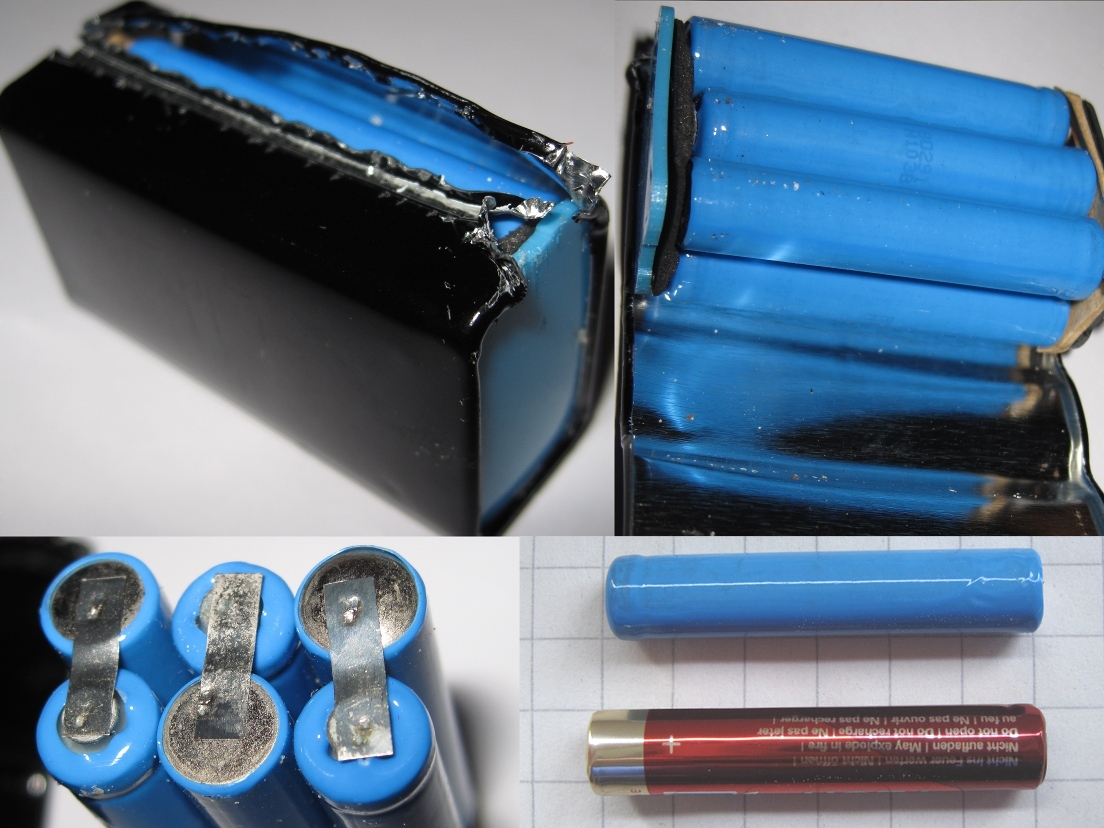
The opening of a 9-volt battery to reveal six LR61 cells, which are similar to AAAA cells.

This battery size is most often used in small devices such as laser pointers, LED penlights, powered computer styluses, glucose meters, and small headphone amplifiers, with Microsoft's Surface Pen the most prominent product taking AAAA batteries. These batteries are not as popular as AAA or AA type batteries, and are consequently not as commonly available in physical stores.

Some models of alkaline nine-volt battery contain six LR61 cells connected by welded tabs. These cells are similar to AAAA cells and can be used in their place in some devices, even though they are 3.5 millimetres (0.14 in) shorter.

== See also ==
- Battery (electricity)
- Battery nomenclature
- Battery recycling
- List of battery types
