= AAA battery =

Standard size of dry cell battery

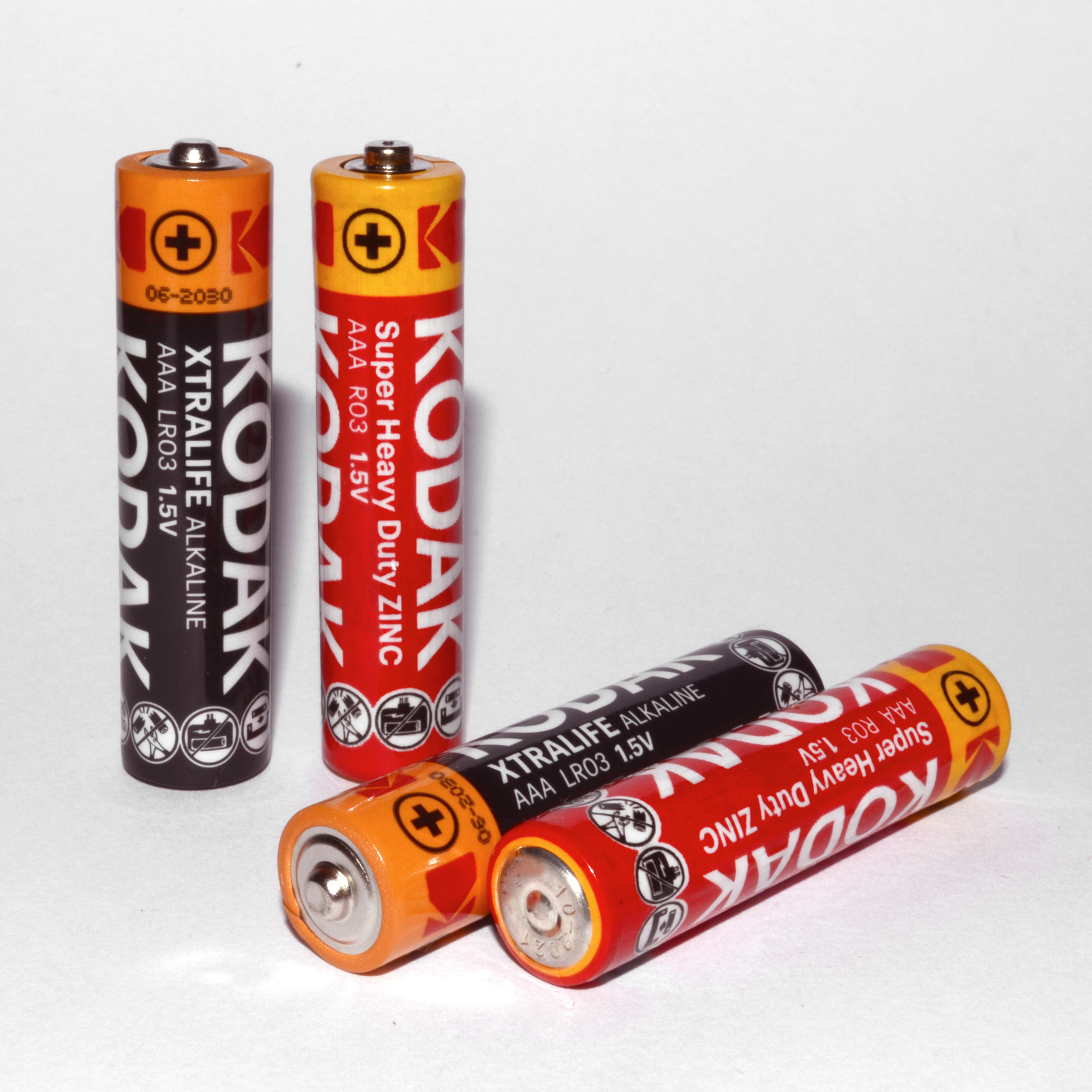
AAA batteries showing both alkaline (LR03) and zinc (R03) versions

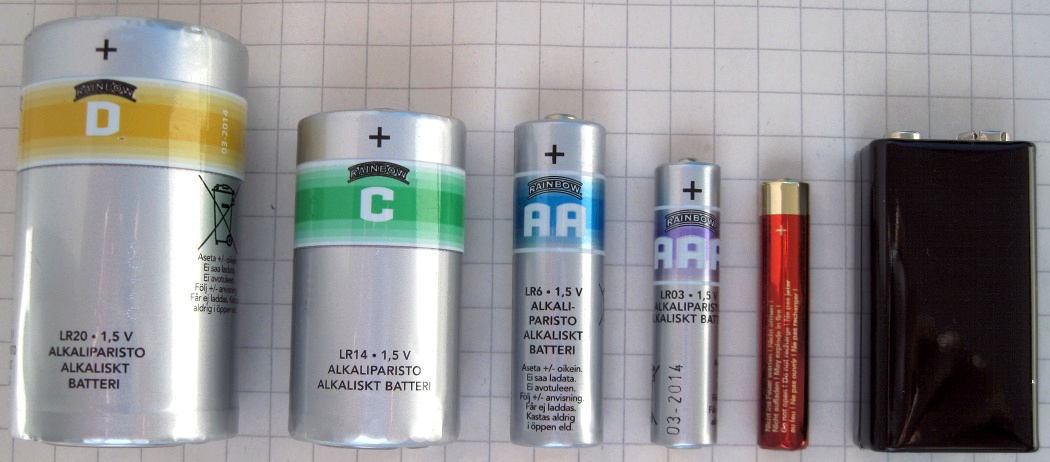
D, C, AA, AAA, AAAA, 9-Volt batteries

The AAA battery (or triple-A battery) is a standard size of dry cell battery. They are commonly used in portable electronic devices, typically low-drain ones. AAA batteries are single cell and are made in both primary (disposable) and secondary (rechargeable) types.

An AAA battery is smaller than an AA battery. It measures 10.5 mm (0.41 in) in diameter and 44.5 mm (1.75 in) in length, including the positive terminal button, which is a minimum 0.8 mm (0.031 in). The positive terminal has a maximum diameter of 3.8 mm (0.15 in); the flat negative terminal has a minimum diameter of 4.3 mm (0.17 in). Alkaline AAA batteries weigh around 11.5 grams (0.41 oz), while primary lithium AAA batteries weigh about 7.6 g (0.27 oz). Rechargeable nickel–metal hydride (NiMH) AAA batteries typically weigh 14–15 g (0.49–0.53 oz).

== Designations ==
A zinc–carbon battery in this size is designated by IEC as R03, by ANSI C18.1 as 24, by old JIS standard as UM-4, and by other manufacturer and national standard designations that vary depending on the cell chemistry. The size was first introduced by The American Ever Ready Company in 1911. In Mainland China, they are called #7 batteries, the name originating from Charles F. Burgess of the Burgess Battery Company designating his AAA batteries "Number 7".

== Use ==
AAA batteries are most often used in small electronic devices, such as TV remote controls, MP3 players and digital cameras. Devices that require the same voltage, but have a higher current draw, are often designed to use larger batteries such as the AA battery type. AA batteries have about three times the capacity of AAA batteries. With the increasing efficiency and miniaturization of modern electronics, many devices that previously were designed for AA batteries (remote controls, cordless computer mice and keyboards, etc.) are being replaced by models that accept AAA battery cells.

As of 2007, AAA batteries accounted for 24% of alkaline primary battery sales in the United States. In Japan as of 2011, 28% of alkaline primary batteries sold were AAA. In Switzerland as of 2007, AAA batteries totaled 30% of primary battery sales and 32% of secondary battery (rechargeable) sales.

Chemistry	IEC name	ANSI/NEDA name	Nominal voltage (V)	Typical capacity (mAh)	Typical capacity (Wh)	Rechargeable
Zinc–carbon	R03	24D	1.5	540	0.81	No
Alkaline	LR03	24A	1.5	860–1,200	1.3–1.8	Some
Li-FeS_{2}	FR03	24LF	1.5	1,200	1.8	No
NiMH	1/2 AAA 10.4mm 22.7mm	GP35AAAH	1.2	~350–1,000	0.42 - 1.2	Yes
Li-ion	1/3 AAA	10180	3.7	~100	0.4	Yes
Li-ion	2/3 AAA	10280	3.7	~200	0.8	Yes
Li-ion	AAA	10440	3.7	~1200	1.3	Yes
NiCd	KR03	24K	1.25	300–500	0.38–0.63	Yes
NiMH	HR03	24H	1.25	600–1,250	0.75–1.6	Yes

== Other common names ==
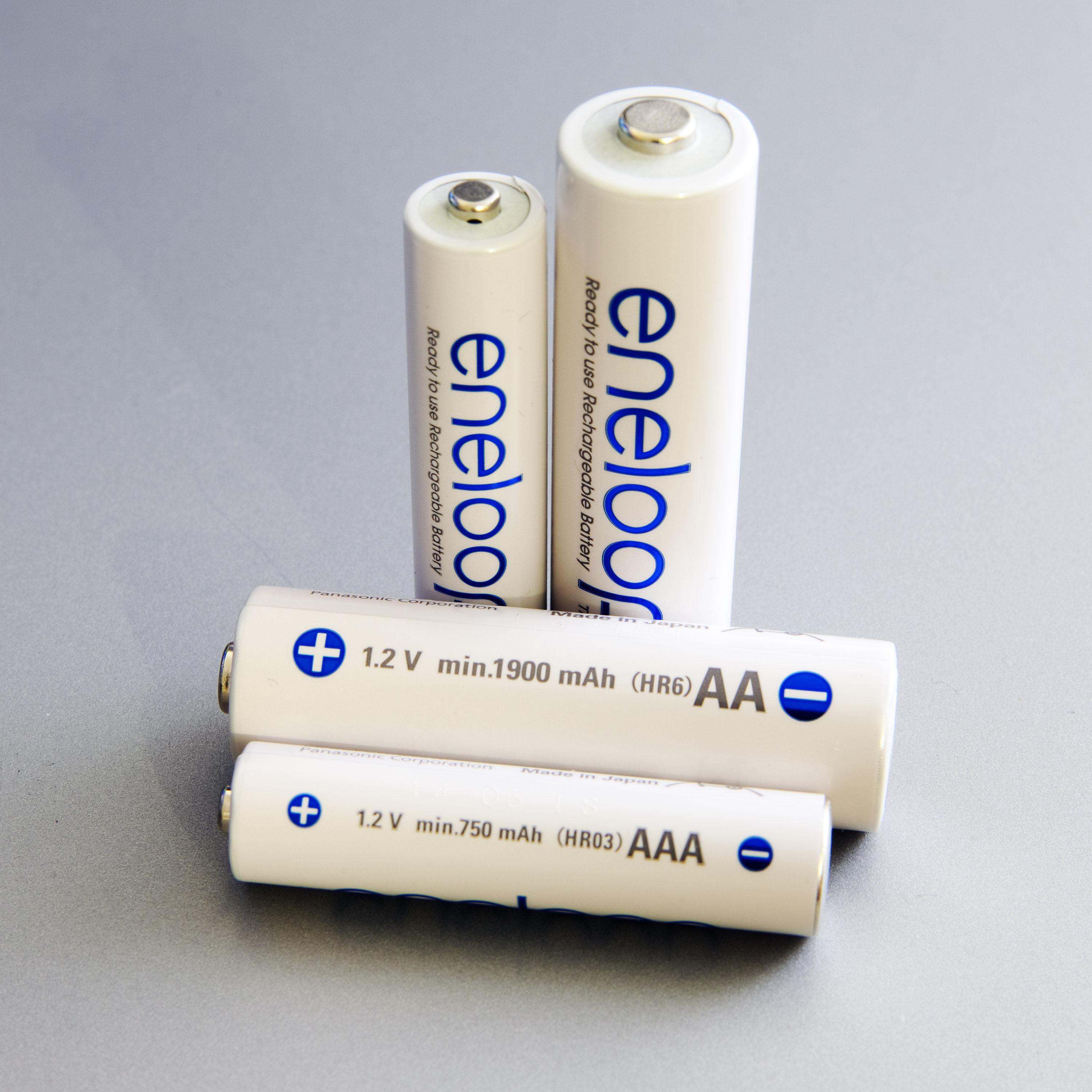
Panasonic Eneloop 1.2 V NiMH rechargeable batteries in AA and AAA

- U16 (In Britain until the 1980s)
- Micro (Germany)
- Ministilo (Italy)
- MN2400
- MX2400
- Type 286 (Soviet Union/Russia)
- Palito (Brazil)
- Pencil cell (India, Turkey)
- UM 4 (JIS)
- #7 (Mainland China)
- #4 (Taiwan)
- 6135-99-117-3143 (NSN)

== See also ==
- List of battery sizes
- Battery nomenclature
- Battery recycling
- Battery holder
