= Yamaha PC-50 =

1983 musical keyboard

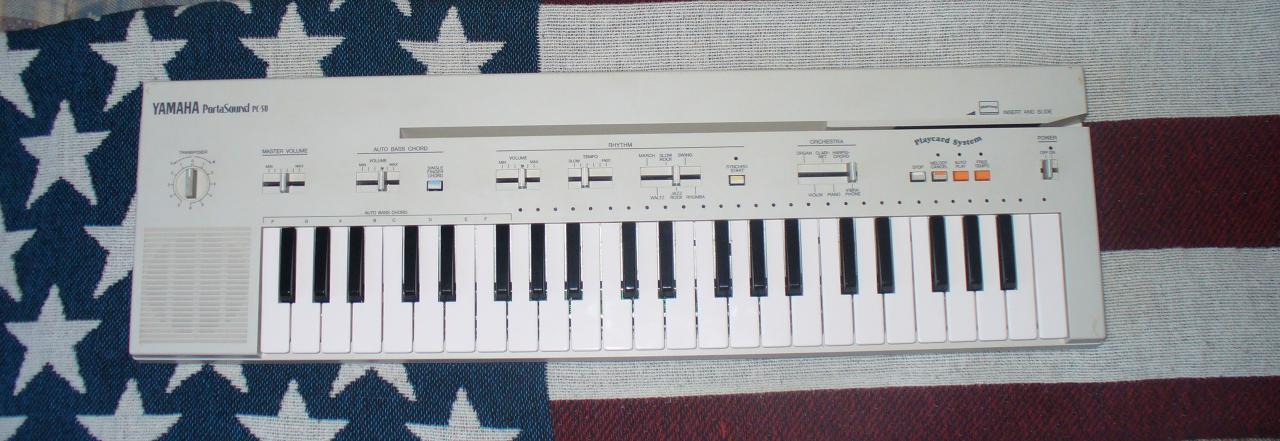
The Yamaha PortaSound PC-50

The Yamaha PortaSound PC-50 is an entry-level portable musical keyboard produced by the Yamaha Corporation in 1983.

== Specifications ==
- 44 keys
- 6 voice polyphony: organ, violin, clarinet, piano, harpsichord, and vibraphone
- 6 rhythm patterns: march, waltz, slow rock, jazz rock, swing, rumba
- Power source: 9VDC by six "C" size batteries or external
- Output ports: 3.5mm headphone jack, aux RCA connector, and expression pedal.
- Input port: power in: 9-12VDC
