= Nickel oxyhydroxide battery =

Type of primary cell

A nickel oxyhydroxide battery (abbr. NiOx, IEC code: Z) is a type of primary cell. It is not rechargeable and must be disposed after a single use. NiOx batteries can be used in high-drain applications such as digital cameras.

NiOx batteries used in low-drain applications have lifespans similar to alkaline batteries. NiOx batteries produce a higher voltage (1.7V) than alkaline batteries (1.5V) which can cause problems in certain products, such as equipment with incandescent light bulbs (such as flashlights/torches) or devices without a voltage regulator.

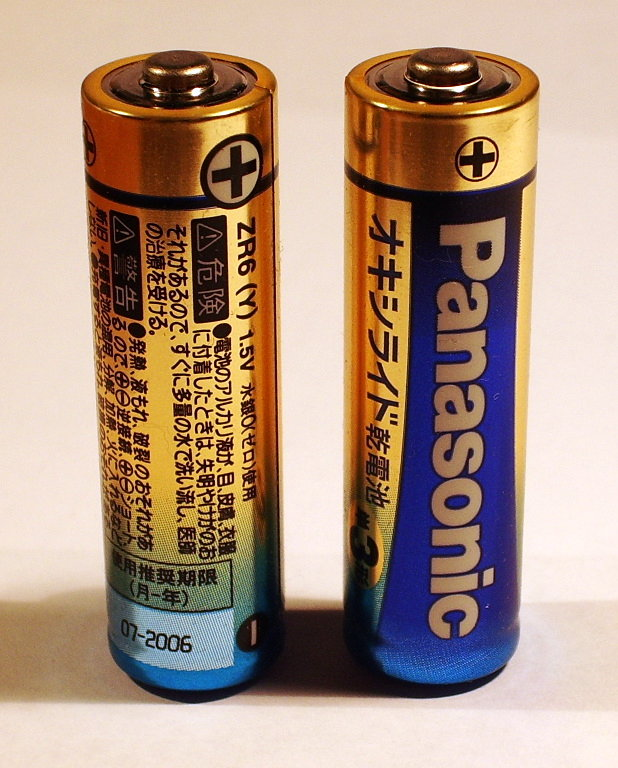
A zinc-nickel oxyhydroxide battery

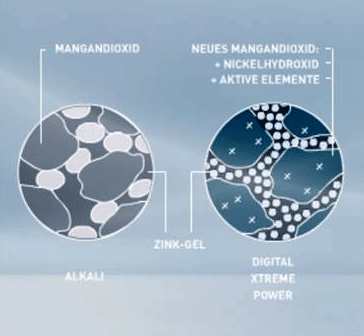
Oxyride battery cathode structure compared with traditional alkaline battery

== Construction ==
The nickel oxyhydroxide cell is different from a standard alkaline battery in the manufacturing process and in chemical composition.

The chemical difference is the addition of nickel oxyhydroxide to the manganese dioxide and graphite for the cathode. This results in an unloaded voltage of 1.7 V DC per cell. The cells sustain a higher average voltage during discharge compared to alkaline batteries, which may cause a false indication in equipment that monitors battery voltage as an indication of remaining operating time.

Finer grained graphite in the cathode and a vacuum pouring process that inserts a higher quantity of electrolyte in the cell are used during the manufacturing of the nickel oxyhydroxide cells.

== See also ==
- List of battery types
