= Self-discharge =

Spontaneous discharge of a charged battery

Self-discharge is a phenomenon in batteries. Self-discharge decreases the shelf life of batteries and causes them to have less than a full charge when actually put to use.

How fast self-discharge in a battery occurs is dependent on the type of battery, state of charge, charging current, ambient temperature and other factors. Primary batteries are not designed for recharging between manufacturing and use, and thus to be practical they must have much lower self-discharge rates than older types of secondary cells. Later, secondary cells with similar very low self-discharge rates were developed, like low-self-discharge nickel–metal hydride cells.

Self-discharge is a chemical reaction, just as closed-circuit discharge is, and tends to occur more quickly at higher temperatures. Storing batteries at lower temperatures thus reduces the rate of self-discharge and preserves the initial energy stored in the battery. Self-discharge is also thought to be reduced as a passivation layer develops on the electrodes over time.

== Typical self-discharge by battery type ==
| Battery chemistry | Rechargeable | Typical self-discharge or shelf life |
|---|---|---|
| Lithium metal | No | 10 years shelf life |
| Alkaline | No | 5 years shelf life |
| Zinc–carbon | No | 2–3 years shelf life |
| Thionyl chloride | No | 1% per year |
| Lithium-ion | Yes | 2–3% per month; ca. 4% p.m. |
| Lithium-polymer | Yes | ~5% per month |
| Low self-discharge NiMH | Yes | As low as 0.25% per month |
| Lead–acid | Yes | 4–6% per month |
| Nickel–cadmium | Yes | 15–20% per month |
| Conventional nickel–metal hydride (NiMH) | Yes | 30% per month |
