= Battery nomenclature =

Naming of types of electrical battery

Standard battery nomenclature describes portable dry cell batteries that have physical dimensions and electrical characteristics interchangeable between manufacturers. The long history of disposable dry cells means that many manufacturer-specific and national standards were used to designate sizes, long before international standards were reached. Technical standards for battery sizes and types are set by standards organizations such as International Electrotechnical Commission (IEC) and American National Standards Institute (ANSI). Popular sizes are still referred to by old standard or manufacturer designations, and some non-systematic designations have been included in current international standards due to wide use.

The complete nomenclature for the battery will fully specify the size, chemistry, terminal arrangements, and special characteristics of a battery. The same physically interchangeable cell size may have widely different characteristics; physical interchangeability is not the sole factor in substitution of batteries.

National standards for dry cell batteries have been developed by ANSI, JIS, British national standards, and others. Civilian, commercial, government, and military standards all exist. Two of the most prevalent standards currently in use are the IEC 60086 series and the ANSI C18.1 series. Both standards give dimensions, standard performance characteristics, and safety information.

Modern standards contain both systematic names for cell types that give information on the composition and approximate size of the cells, as well as arbitrary numeric codes for cell size.

== History of the IEC standard ==
The International Electrotechnical Commission (IEC) was established in France in 1906 and co-ordinates development of standards for a wide range of electrical products. The IEC maintains two committees, TC21 established in 1933 for rechargeable batteries, and TC35 established in 1948 for primary batteries, to develop standards. The current designation system was adopted in 1992. Battery types are designated with a letter/number sequence indicating number of cells, cell chemistry, cell shape, dimensions, and special characteristics. Certain cell designations from earlier revisions of the standard have been retained.

The first IEC standards for battery sizes were issued in 1957. Since 1992, International standard IEC 60086 defines an alphanumeric coding system for batteries. British standard 397 for primary batteries was withdrawn and replaced by the IEC standard in 1996.

== History of the ANSI standard ==
Standardization of batteries in the United States started in 1919, when the US National Bureau of Standards published recommended test procedures and standard dimensions of cells. American standards were revised several times during the following decades, as new sizes of cells were introduced and new chemistry developed, including chloride, alkaline, mercury and rechargeable types.

The first American Standards Association (predecessor to ANSI) standard C18 appeared in 1928. It listed cell sizes using a letter code, roughly in order of size from smallest (A) to larger types. The only numerical designation was the 6-inch tall "No. 6" cell. The older "No. 1" through "No. 5" batteries were discontinued, each being 1 to 5 inches high respectively, although the similarly sized Burgess No. 1 (C cell) and No. 2 (D cell) were still produced under that name through the 1950s. Eventually, the No. 6 was phased out by the 1970s and slowly replaced with the 6-volt four-cell battery. The 1934 edition of the C18 standard expanded the nomenclature system to include series and parallel arrays of cells. In 1954, mercury batteries were included in the standard. The 1959 edition identified types suitable for use with transistor radios. In 1967, NEMA took over responsibility for development from the National Bureau of Standards. The 12th edition of C18 began to be harmonized with the IEC standard. Rechargeable batteries were introduced in the C18 standard in 1984, and lithium types were standardized in 1991.

In 1999 the ANSI standards were extensively revised and separate safety standards provided. The current edition of the ANSI standards designates sizes with an arbitrary number, with a prefix letter to designate shape, and with a suffix letter or letters to identify different chemistry, terminals, or other features.

== IEC battery nomenclature ==
Three different technical committees of IEC make standards on batteries: TC21 (lead-acid), SC21 (other secondary) and TC35 (primary). Each group has published standards relating to the nomenclature of batteries - IEC 60095 for lead-acid starter batteries, IEC 61951-1 and 61951-2 for Ni-Cd and Ni-MH batteries, IEC 61960 for Li-ion, and IEC 60086-1 for primary batteries.

=== Primary batteries ===
==== Battery numbering ====
IEC 60086 battery type designation system

Examples of the IEC nomenclature are batteries coded R20, 4R25X, 4LR25-2, 6F22, 6P222/162, CR17345 and LR2616J. The letters and numbers in the code indicate the number of cells, cell chemistry, shape, dimensions, the number of parallel paths in the assembled battery and any modifying letters deemed necessary. A multi-section battery (two or more voltages from the same package) will have a multi-section designation.

Prior to October 1990, round cells were designated with a sequential numeric size code ranging from R06 through to R70; for example, R20 is the size of a "D" cell or ANSI "13" size. After October 1990, round cells became systematically identified with a number derived from their diameter and height. Primary cells larger than 100 mm in diameter or height are designated with an oblique "/" between diameter and height.

Examples of IEC battery designations
Designation	Series Cells	System	Shape	Standardized code or diameter code	Diameter modifier	Height code	Height adjustment modifier	Modifier(s)	Parallel strings	Remarks
R20			R	20						A single zinc-carbon cell, "size 20" which is equivalent to D, or ANSI "13" size
4R25X	4		R	25				X		A zinc-carbon lantern battery, consisting of 4 round "size 25" cells in series. Terminated with spring terminals.
4LR25-2	4	L	R	25					2	An alkaline lantern battery, consisting of 2 parallel strings of 4 round "size 25" cells in series
6F22	6		F	22						A zinc-carbon rectangular battery, consisting of 6 flat "size 22" cells. Equivalent to a PP3 or transistor battery.
6P222/162	6		P	222		162				A zinc-carbon battery, maximum dimensions: length 192 mm, width 113 mm, and height 162 mm. Consisting of 6 cells in series.
CR17345		C	R	17		345				A single-cell round lithium cell, 17 mm diameter, 34.5 mm height
LR2616J		L	R	26		16	J			A single-cell round alkaline battery, 26.2 mm diameter, 1.67 mm height
LR8D425		L	R	8.5	D	425				A single-cell round alkaline battery, 8.8 mm diameter (8.5 +0.3 for modifier) and 42.5 mm long, AAAA or ANSI "25" size

==== Electrochemical system ====
The first letter identifies the chemical composition of the battery, which also implies a nominal voltage.

It is common to refer to the negative electrode first in IEC battery definitions.

IEC codes for battery electrochemical systems
Letter code	Negative electrode	Electrolyte	Positive electrode	Nominal voltage (V)	Maximum open circuit voltage (V)	Main article
(none)	Zinc	Ammonium chloride, Zinc chloride	Manganese dioxide	1.5	1.725	Zinc–carbon battery
A	Zinc	Ammonium chloride, Zinc chloride	Oxygen	1.4	1.55	Zinc–air battery
B	Lithium	Organic electrolyte	Carbon monofluoride	3.0	3.7	Lithium battery
C	Lithium	Organic electrolyte	Manganese dioxide	3.0	3.7	Lithium battery
E	Lithium	Non-aqueous inorganic electrolyte	Thionyl chloride	3.6	3.9	Lithium battery
F	Lithium	Organic electrolyte	Iron disulfide	1.5	1.83	Lithium battery
G	Lithium	Organic electrolyte	Copper(II) oxide	1.5	2.3	Lithium battery
L	Zinc	Alkali metal hydroxide	Manganese dioxide	1.5	1.65	Alkaline battery
M (withdrawn)	Zinc	Alkali metal hydroxide	Mercuric oxide	1.35		Mercury battery
N (withdrawn)	Zinc	Alkali metal hydroxide	Mercuric oxide, manganese dioxide	1.4		Mercury battery
P	Zinc	Alkali metal hydroxide	Oxygen	1.4	1.68	Zinc-air battery
S	Zinc	Alkali metal hydroxide	Silver oxide	1.55	1.63	Silver-oxide battery
Z	Zinc	Alkali metal hydroxide	Manganese dioxide, nickel oxyhydroxide	1.5	1.78	Nickel oxyhydroxide battery

Italics indicate a chemical system unlikely to be found in consumer or general-purpose batteries, or withdrawn from the current standard.

==== Shape ====
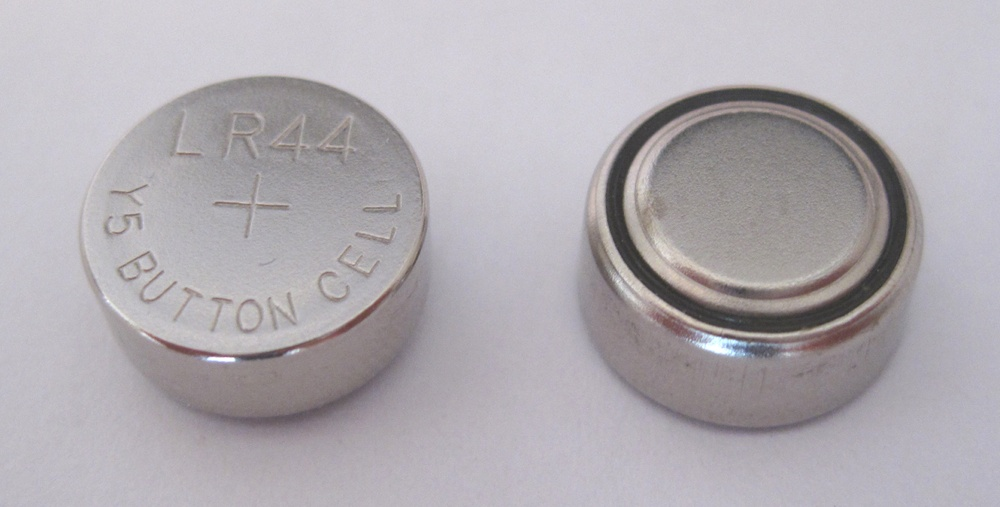
LR44 alkaline cell

Shape codes are:

R Round, (coin, button or cylindrical)
P Prismatic
F Flat (layer built)
S Square (or rectangular or prismatic)

The F and S shape codes are still in use but are not to be used for new battery definitions.

==== Size code ====
Certain sizes, given by one or two digit numbers, represent standard size codes from previous editions of the standard. Sizes given as 4 or more digits indicate the diameter of the battery and the overall height.

The numbers in the code correlate with the battery dimensions. For batteries with dimensions of < 100 mm the (truncated) diameter in millimetres, followed by the height in tenths of a millimetre; for batteries with a single dimension ≥ 100 mm the diameter in millimetres, then a slash (/) followed by the height in millimetres.

As well as the recommended size code definitions there are also ten modifying suffix letters that can be added to the end of the specific size code. These run from A to L (omitting F and I) and depending on the largest dimension of the battery can either signify 0.0 – 0.9 mm maximum dimensions or 0.00 – 0.09 mm maximum dimensions with A being 0.0 or 0.00 and L being 0.9 or 0.09.

For flat cells the diameter code is given as the diameter of a circle circumscribed around the whole cell's area.

Standardized size codes for round batteries which do not follow the current nomenclature but have been retained for ease of use are given by a one or two digit number following the R. These include but are not limited to:

IEC size codes for round batteries
Number code	Nominal diameter	Nominal height	Common name
R25	32	91	F
R20	34.2	61.5	D
R14	26.2	50.0	C
R6	14.5	50.5	AA
R1	12.0	30.2	N
R03	10.5	44.5	AAA

Round button batteries also carry two-digit size codes such as R44. Other round, flat, and square sizes have been standardized but are used mostly for components of multi-cell batteries.

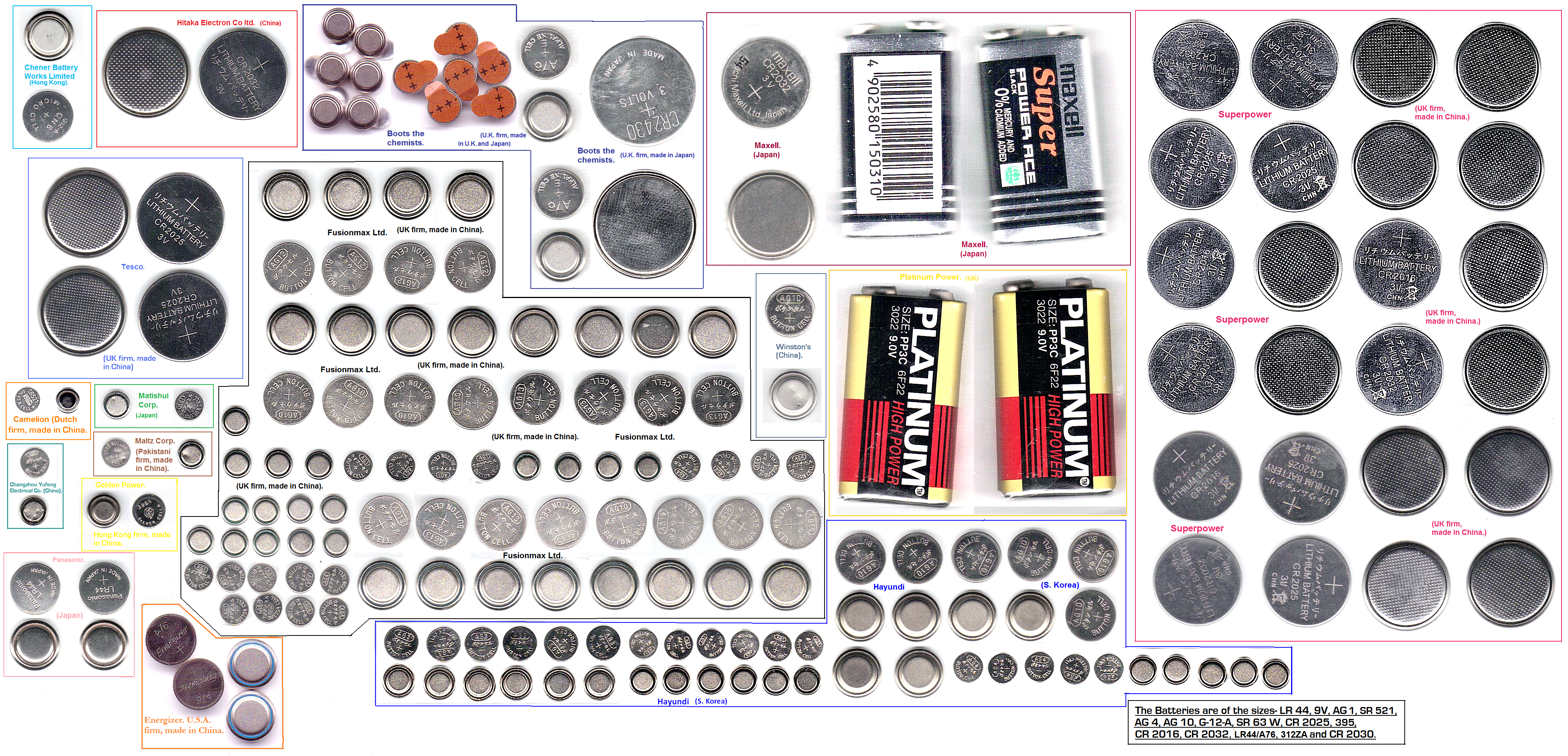
Assorted sizes of button and coin cells, including alkaline and silver oxide chemistries. Four rectangular 9 V batteries are also shown, for size comparison. Enlarge to see the button and coin cell size code markings.

The following is a partial list of IEC standard recommended diameter and height codes for round cells:

IEC recommended round cell diameter and height codes
Number code	Maximum diameter	Maximum height
4	4.8	
5	5.8	
6	6.8	
7	7.9	
9	9.5	
10	10.0	
11	11.6	
12	12.5	1.20
16	16	1.60
20	20	2.00
23	23	
24	24.5	
25		2.50
30		3.00
36		3.60
50		5.00

==== Modifiers ====
After the package size code(s), additional letters may optionally appear. Terminal styles and variants of the same battery can be designated with the letters X or Y. Performance levels may also be designated with a C, P, S, CF, HH, or HB or other letter suffixes. An appended letter "W" states that this battery complies with all the requirements of the IEC 60086-3 standard for watch batteries, such as dimensional tolerance, chemical leakage, and test methods.

==== Battery categories ====
IEC nomenclature classifies batteries according to their general shape and overall physical appearance. These categories, however, are not identified in the IEC battery nomenclature:

- Category 1: Cylindrical cells with protruding positive and recessed or flat negative terminals. The positive terminal shall be concentric with the cell overall. The total height of the cell is not necessarily the same as the total distance between terminals (This accounts for nubs, recesses and battery casings). The cell casing is insulated. E.g. R1 & LR8D425
- Category 2: Cylindrical cells with protruding positive and protruding or flat negative terminals. The total height of the cell is the same as the total distance between terminals. The cell casing is insulated. E.g. CR14250, LR61
- Category 3: Cylindrical cells with flat positive and negative terminals. The total height of the cell is not necessarily the same as the total distance between terminals (This accounts for any protuberances from the negative terminal). The cell casing is in connection with the positive terminal. No part of the cell is allowed to protrude from the positive terminal surface. E.g. CR11108, LR9
- Category 4: Cylindrical cells with a protruding flat negative terminal. The total height of the cell is the same as the total distance between terminals. The cell casing is the positive terminal and it is recommended that the outer surface is used for positive connection even though it is possible from the base. No part of the cell is allowed to protrude from the positive terminal surface. E.g. LR44, CR2032
- Category 5: Cylindrical batteries which fit none of the other categories. E.g. R40, 8LR23
- Category 6: Non-cylindrical batteries. E.g. 3R12, 4R25, 6F22

=== Secondary batteries ===
==== Nickel-cadmium and nickel-metal hydride batteries ====
Nickel-cadmium and Nickel-metal hydride batteries follow a similar rule as the system above; especially cylindrical cells designed to be dimensionally interchangeable with primary batteries use the same designation as the primary batteries, the codes for electrochemical systems as below.

Letter code	Negative electrode	Positive electrode	Nominal voltage (V)	Main article
H	Hydrogen-absorbing alloy	Nickel oxide	1.2	Nickel-metal hydride battery
K	Cadmium	Nickel oxide	1.2	Nickel-cadmium battery

All other cells use the following system:

- Small prismatic cells: KF or HF followed by maximum width in mm / maximum thickness in mm / maximum height in mm. E.g. KF 18/07/49
- Cylindrical cells: KR or HR followed by a letter indicating discharge rate (L, M, H or X for low, medium, high and very high, respectively); then another letter may be added to indicate use at elevated temperatures (T or U) or rapid charge (R); then maximum diameter in mm / maximum height in mm. E.g. KRL 33/62, HRHR 23/43
- Button cells: KB or HB followed by maximum diameter in tenths of mm / maximum height in tenths of mm. E.g. KBL 116/055

==== Lithium-ion batteries ====
IEC 61960 battery type designation system

Lithium-ion batteries have a different rule for naming, which applies both to batteries of multiple cells and single cell. They will be designated as:

N_{1}A_{1}A_{2}A_{3}N_{2}/N_{3}/N_{4}-N_{5}

where N_{1} denotes number of series connected cells and N_{5} denotes number of parallel connected cells (only when the number is greater than 1); these numbers only apply to batteries.

A_{1} indicates the basis of negative electrode phase, where I is for lithium ion and L is for lithium metal or alloy.

A_{2} indicates the basis of positive electrode phase, and could be C, N, M, V or T for cobalt, nickel, manganese, vanadium and titanium respectively.

A_{3} is for the shape of the cell; either R for cylinder or P for prism.

N_{2} is the maximum diameter (in case of cylindrical cells) or thickness (prismatic cells) in mm.

N_{3} is only used for prismatic cells to denote the maximum width in mm.

N_{4} is the maximum overall height in mm.

(For any of the lengths above, if the dimension is smaller than 1 mm it can be written as tN, where N is tenths of mm)

E.g. ICR19/66, ICP9/35/48, 2ICP20/34/70, 1ICP20/68/70-2

== ANSI battery nomenclature ==
Early editions of the ANSI standard used a letter code to identify the dimensions of the cell. Since at the time there were only carbon-zinc cells, no suffix letters or other notation were required. The letter system was introduced in the 1924 edition of the standard, with letters A through J assigned approximately in order of increasing cell volume, for cells typically manufactured at that time. By 1934, the system had been revised and extended to 17 sizes ranging from NS at 7/16 inch diameter by 3/4 inch height, through size J at 1 3/4 inches diameter by 5 7/8 inches high, to the largest standard cell which retained its old designation of No. 6 and which was 2 1/2 inches in diameter and 6 inches high.

=== Size and shape codes ===
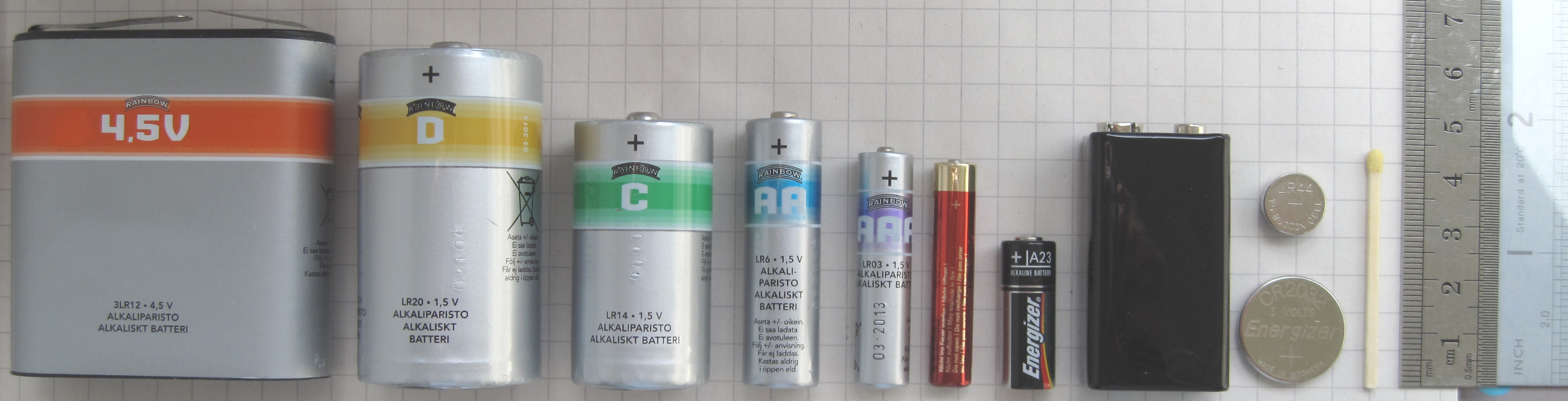
4.5-Volt, D, C, AA, AAA, AAAA, A23, 9-Volt, CR2032 and LR44 cells

The current edition of the standard uses a numerical code to show the cell size. Common round cell sizes are:

ANSI primary cell sizes and equivalent size designations
Number code	Other name	IEC size	Example
13	D	R20	
14	C	R14	
15	AA	R6	15A LR6 SIZE/FORMAT AA 1.5V
24	AAA	R03	24A LR03 SIZE/FORMAT AAA 1.5V
25	AAAA	R8D425	

Since these IEC and ANSI battery standards have been harmonized, for example, an R20 cell will have the same dimensions as an ANSI 13 cell.

Flat cells, used as components of multi-cell batteries, have an F prefix and a series of numbers to identify sizes. Coin cells were assigned size codes in the 5000 range.

Secondary cells using systems H and K (nickel-metal hydride and nickel-iron sulfide) have a separate series of size codes, but the cells are dimensionally interchangeable with primary cells.

=== System and performance suffix letters ===
The electrochemical system and performance information is given in suffix letters.

ANSI suffix letters
Letter	Significance	IEC system letter
(none)	carbon-zinc	(none)
A	alkaline	L
AC	alkaline industrial	L
AP	alkaline photographic	L
C	carbon-zinc industrial	(none)
CD	carbon zinc industrial, heavy duty	(none)
D	carbon zinc, heavy duty	(none)
F	carbon zinc, general purpose	(none)
H	nickel metal hydride (rechargeable)	H
K	nickel cadmium (rechargeable)	K
LB	lithium-carbon monofluoride	B
LC	lithium-manganese dioxide	C
LF	lithium-iron disulfide	F
M (withdrawn)	mercuric oxide	M (withdrawn)
SO	silver oxide	S
SOP	silver oxide photographic	S
Z	zinc-air	P
ZD	zinc-air, heavy duty	P

== See also ==
- Battery recycling
- Comparison of commercial battery types
- History of the battery
- List of battery sizes
- List of battery types
- Search for the Super Battery (2017 PBS film)
