= Silver oxide =

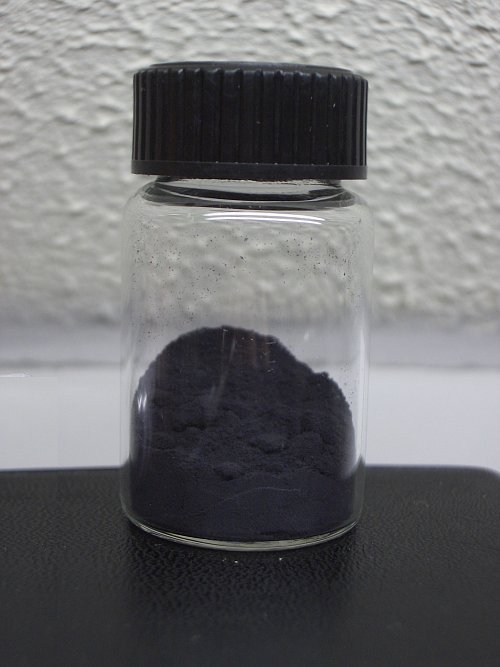
- Silver(I) oxide powder

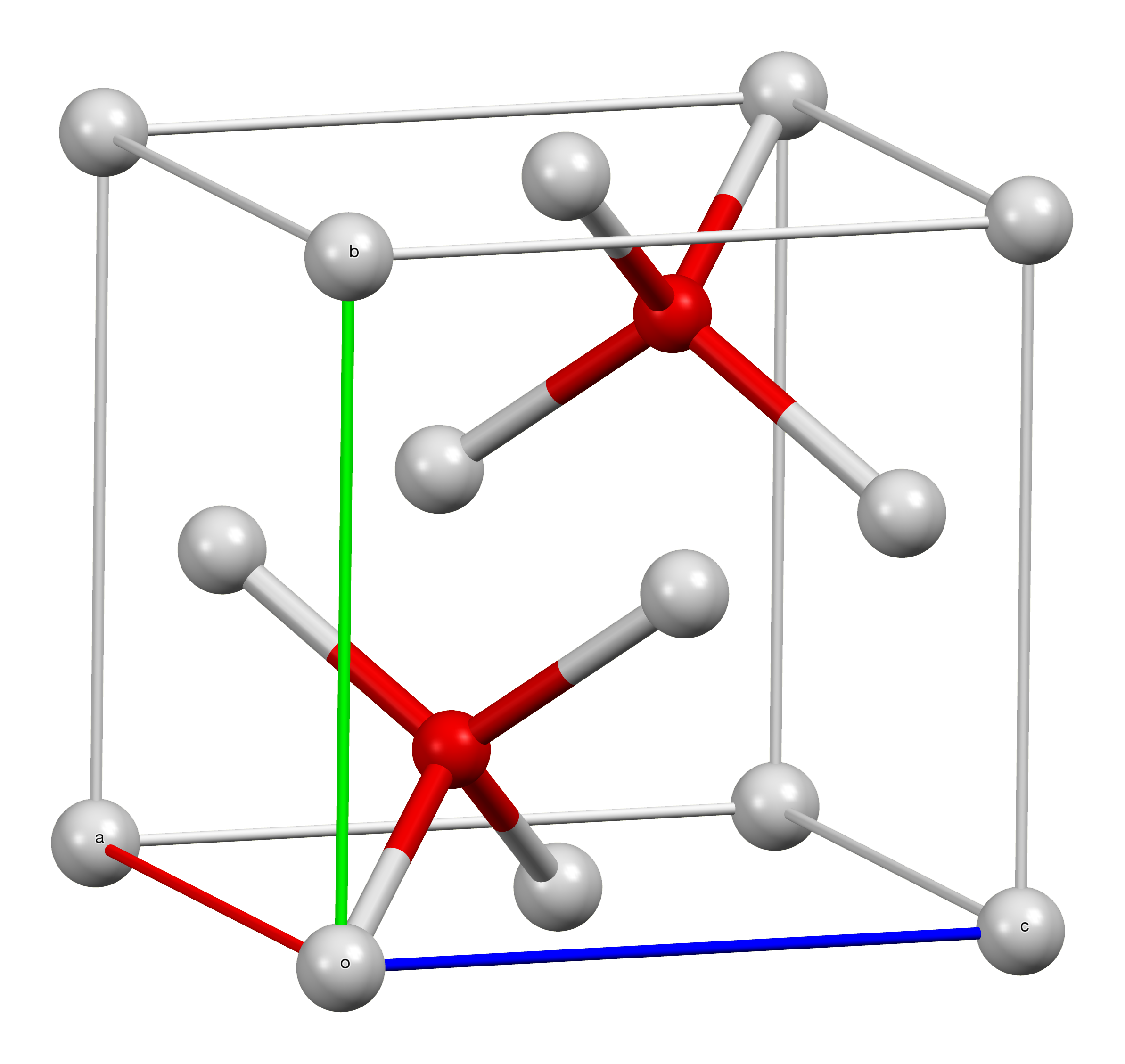
Silver(I) oxide structure in unit cell
Unit cell
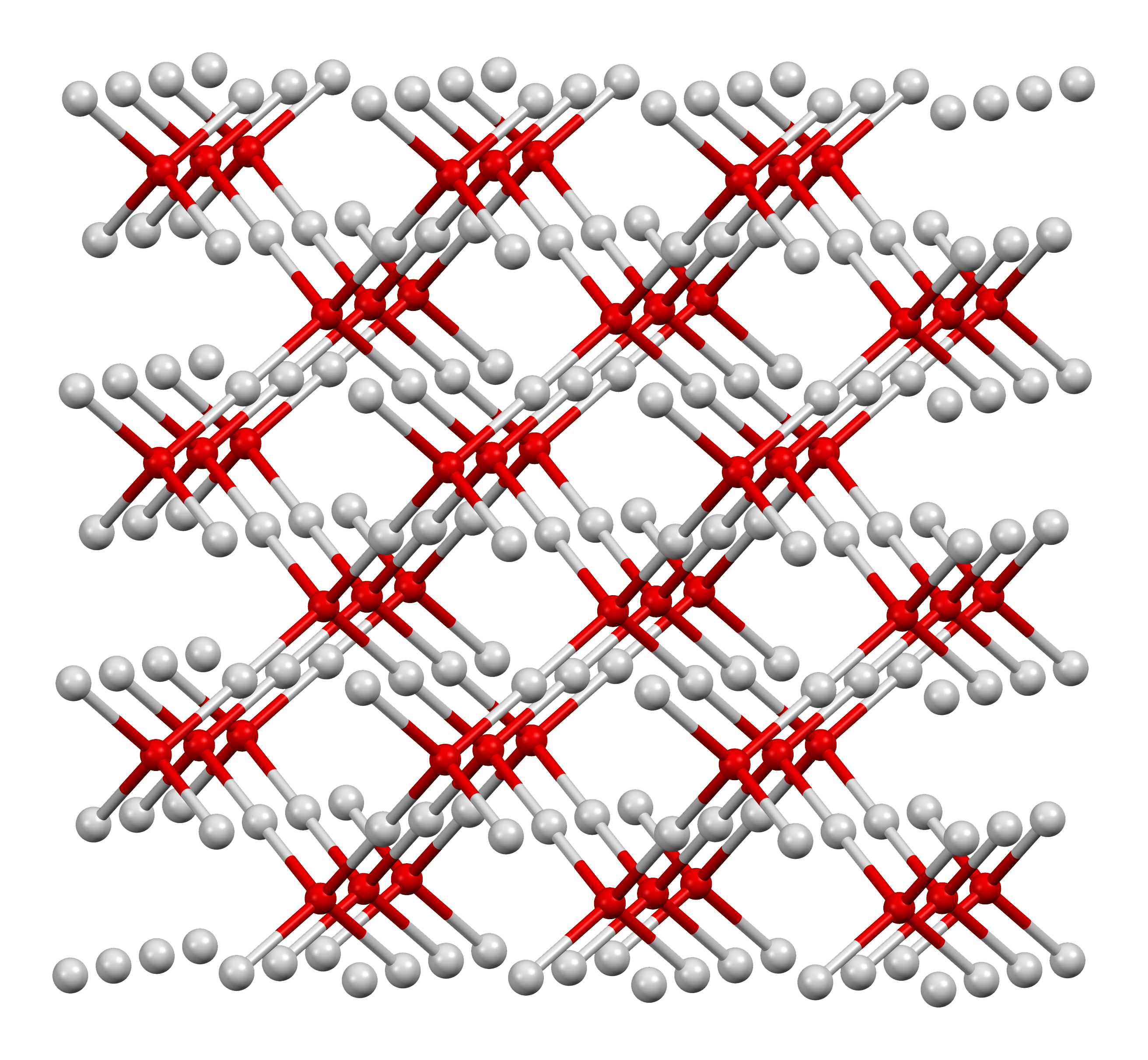
Crystal packing

Names
- IUPAC name Silver(I) oxide
- Other names Silver rust, Argentous oxide, Silver monoxide

Identifiers
CAS Number	20667-12-3
3D model (JSmol)	Interactive image
ChemSpider	7970393
ECHA InfoCard	100.039.946
EC Number	243-957-1
MeSH	silver+oxide
PubChem CID	9794626
RTECS number	VW4900000
UNII	897WUN6G6T
CompTox Dashboard (EPA)	DTXSID40893897
- InChI: InChI=1S/2Ag.O/q2*+1;-2 Key: NDVLTYZPCACLMA-UHFFFAOYSA-N; InChI=1S/2Ag.O/q2*+1;-2 Key: NDVLTYZPCACLMA-UHFFFAOYSA-N
- SMILES: [O-2].[Ag+].[Ag+]

Properties
Chemical formula	Ag_{2}O
Molar mass	231.735 g·mol^{−1}
Appearance	Black/brown cubic crystals
Odor	Odorless
Density	7.14 g/cm^{3}
Melting point	decomposes from ≥350 °C
Solubility in water	0.013 g/L (20 °C); 0.025 g/L (25 °C); 0.053 g/L (80 °C)
Solubility product (K_{sp}) of AgOH	1.52·10^{−8} (20 °C)
Solubility	Soluble in acid, alkali Insoluble in ethanol
Acidity (pK_{a})	12.1 (estimated)
Magnetic susceptibility (χ)	−134.0·10^{−6} cm^{3}/mol

Structure
Crystal structure	Cubic
Space group	Pn3̅m, 224

Thermochemistry
Heat capacity (C)	65.9 J/mol·K
Std molar entropy (S^{⦵}_{298})	122 J/mol·K
Std enthalpy of formation (Δ_{f}H^{⦵}_{298})	−31 kJ/mol
Gibbs free energy (Δ_{f}G^{⦵})	−11.3 kJ/mol

Hazards
- GHS labelling
Pictograms	(GHS03: Oxidizing) (GHS07: Exclamation mark)
Signal word	Danger
Hazard statements	H272, H315, H319, H335
Precautionary statements	P220, P261, P305+P351+P338
NFPA 704 (fire diamond)	2 0 1
- Lethal dose or concentration (LD, LC)
LD_{50} (median dose)	2.82 g/kg (rats, oral)

Related compounds
Related compounds	Silver(I,III) oxide
- Except where otherwise noted, data are given for materials in their standard state (at 25 °C [77 °F], 100 kPa). verify (what is ?) Infobox references

Silver oxide is the chemical compound with the formula Ag_{2}O. It is a fine black or dark brown powder that is used to prepare other silver compounds.

== Preparation ==
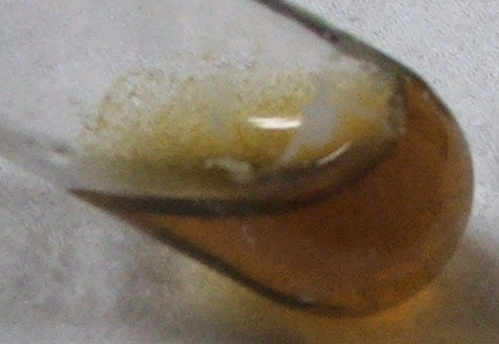
Silver(I) oxide produced by reacting lithium hydroxide with a very dilute silver nitrate solution

Silver oxide can be prepared by combining aqueous solutions of silver nitrate and an alkali hydroxide. This reaction does not afford appreciable amounts of silver hydroxide due to the favorable energetics for the following reaction:

2 AgOH → Ag_{2}O + H_{2}O (pK = 2.875)

With suitably controlled conditions, this reaction can be used to prepare Ag_{2}O powder with properties suitable for several uses including as a fine grained conductive paste filler.

== Structure and properties ==
Ag_{2}O features linear, two-coordinate Ag centers linked by tetrahedral oxides. It is isostructural with Cu_{2}O. It "dissolves" in solvents that degrade it. It is slightly soluble in water due to the formation of the ion Ag(OH)^{−}_{2} and possibly related hydrolysis products. It is soluble in ammonia solution, producing active compound of Tollens' reagent. A slurry of Ag_{2}O is readily attacked by acids:

Ag_{2}O + 2 HX → 2 AgX + H_{2}O

where HX = HF, HCl, HBr, HI, or CF_{3}COOH. It will also react with solutions of alkali chlorides to precipitate silver chloride, leaving a solution of the corresponding alkali hydroxide.

Despite the photosensitivity of many silver compounds, silver oxide is not photosensitive. A significant amount of the oxide reduces to metallic silver at temperatures above 380 °C.

== Applications ==
This oxide is used in silver-oxide batteries. In organic chemistry, silver oxide is used as a mild oxidizing agent. For example, it oxidizes aldehydes to carboxylic acids.
