= Silver oxide battery =

Battery using silver oxide as the cathode material

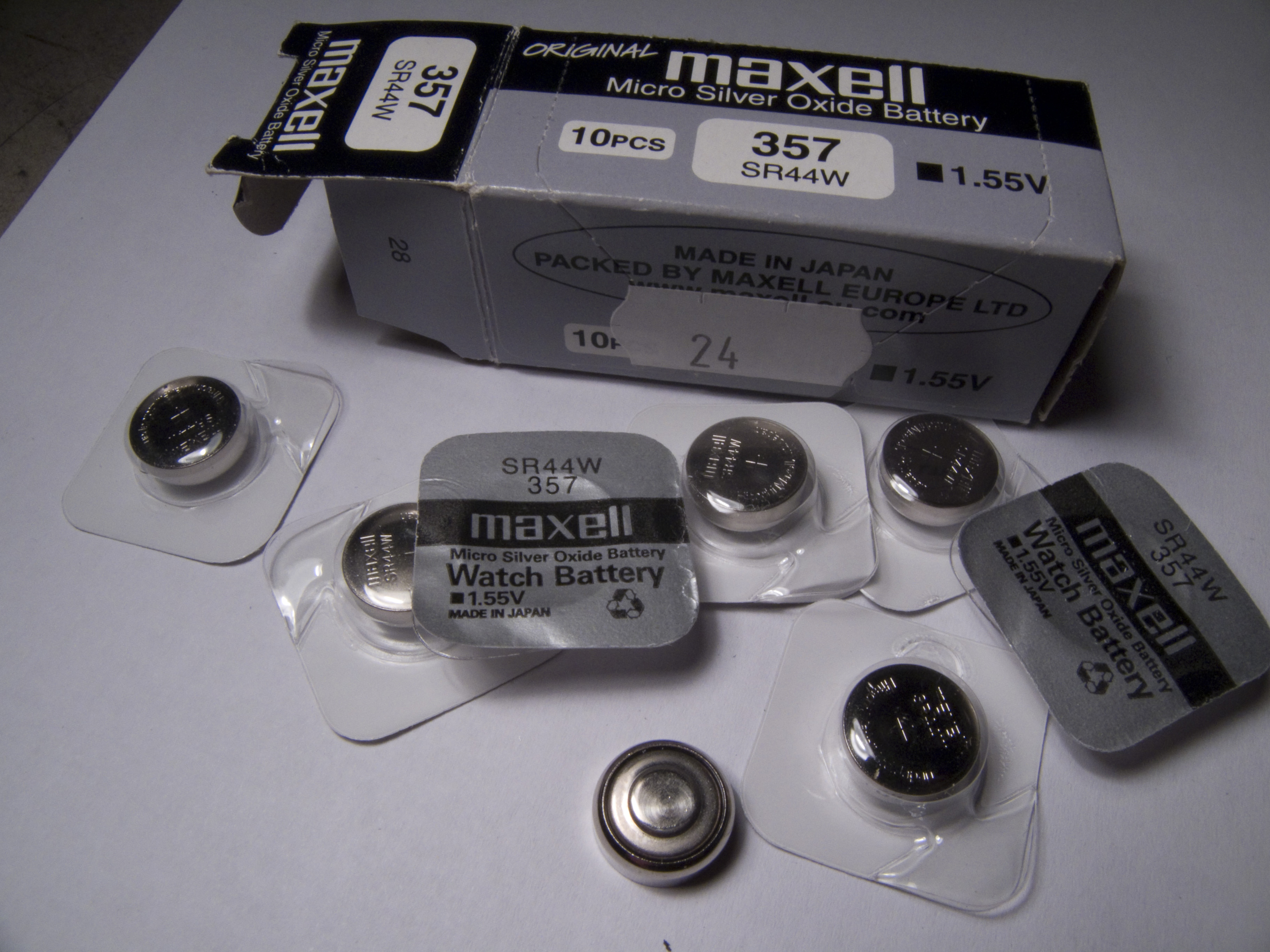
- Silver oxide cells
- Specific energy: 130 Wh/kg
- Energy density: 500 Wh/L
- Specific power: High
- Charge/discharge efficiency: N/A
- Energy/consumer-price: Low
- Time durability: High
- Cycle durability: N/A
- Nominal cell voltage: 1.55V

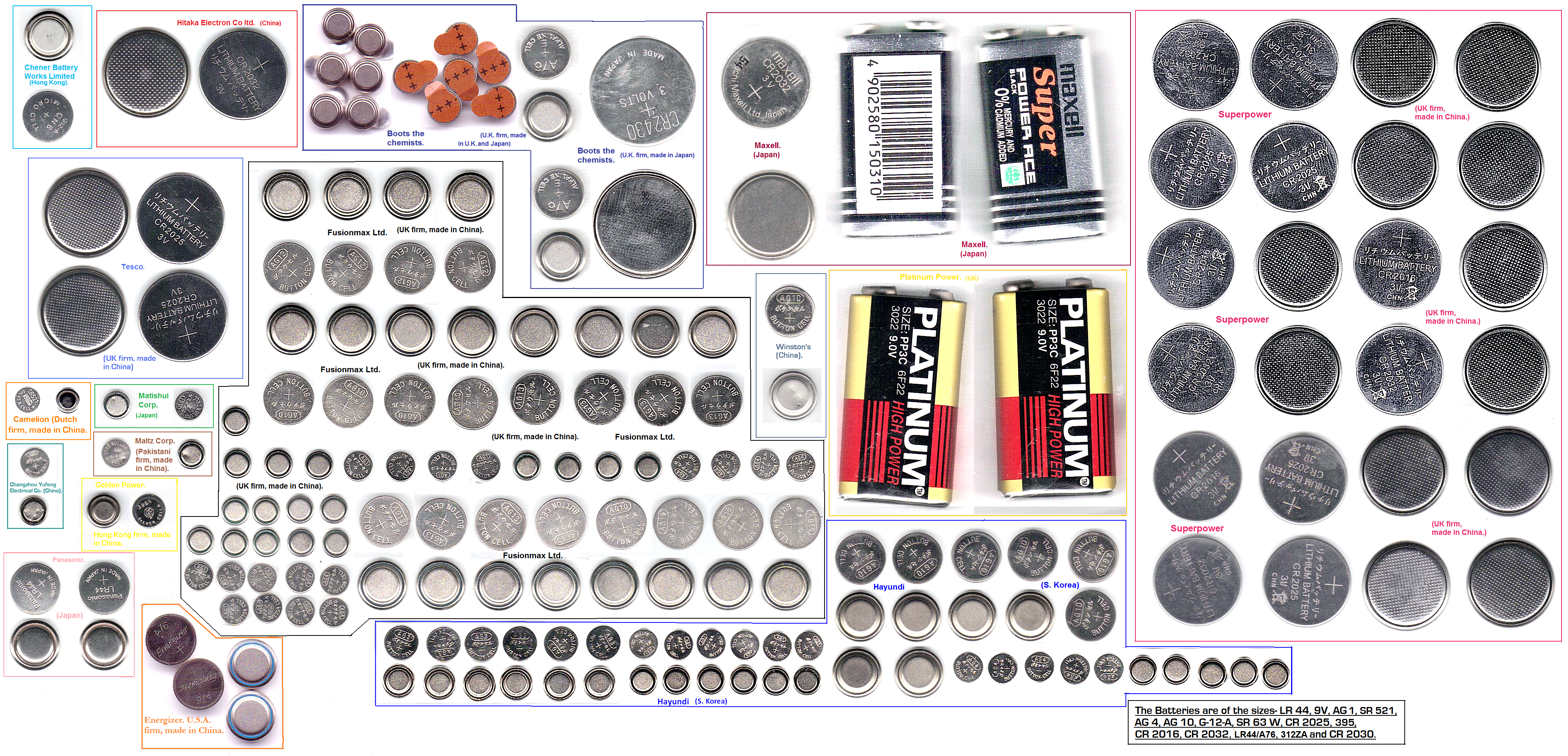
Several different types and sizes of button and coin cells. Some of the cells pictured above are silver oxide cells.

A silver oxide battery (IEC code: S) is a primary cell using silver oxide as the cathode material and zinc for the anode. These cells maintain a nearly constant nominal voltage during discharge until fully depleted. They are available in small sizes as button cells, where the amount of silver used is minimal and not a prohibitively expensive contributor to the overall product cost.

Silver oxide primary batteries account for 30% of all primary battery sales in Japan (64 mil. out of 212 million in February 2020).

== History ==
A silver oxide cell was first constructed by Alessandro Volta in late 1800. This consisted of a circle of cups of a liquid saline electrolyte, containing alternating zinc and silver strips connected by wire. It is claimed that 20 such cups were sufficient for the electrolysis of water.

Large silver oxide batteries were used on early ICBM's and satellites because of their high energy-to-weight ratio. For example the Corona reconnaissance satellites used them, as did the Agena-D rocket upper stage. Later, they were also used in the Apollo Lunar Module and lunar rover.

== Specifications ==
- Cell voltage
  - Open circuit voltage = 1.6 V
  - Working voltage = 1.2~1.5 V
- Energy density = 130 Wh/kg (60 Wh/lb)
- Service life of several thousand hours (continuous operation)
- Shelf stable over several years (retaining 90% of initial capacity)

Silver oxide cells are a primary battery and do not have a cycle life or a rate of charging and discharging. However, the U.S. Department of Defense has developed a secondary battery out of silver oxide-zinc technology, with a capacity in the order of “tens of MW·h”.

Typical silver oxide cells are stable at temperatures below 100°C, at which point leakage can occur.

== Chemistry ==
A silver oxide battery uses silver(I) oxide as the positive electrode (cathode), zinc as the negative electrode (anode), plus an alkaline electrolyte, usually sodium hydroxide (NaOH) or potassium hydroxide (KOH). The silver is reduced at the cathode from Ag(I) to Ag, and the zinc is oxidized from Zn to Zn(II).

The half-cell reaction at the positive plate:

$\ce{Ag2O + H2O + 2e- -> 2Ag + 2OH-}$, $(E^\circ = +0.34\text{ V})$

The half-cell reaction at the negative plate:

$\ce{{Zn} + 2OH^- -> \overset{Zinc~hydroxide}{Zn(OH)2} + 2e-}$, $(E^\circ = -1.22\text{ V})$

Overall reaction:

$\ce{Zn + H2O + Ag2O -> Zn(OH)2 + 2Ag}$, $(E^\circ = +1.56\text{ V})$

Overall reaction (anhydrous form):

$$\ce{{Zn} + Ag2O ->[\ce{KOH/NaOH}] \overset{Zinc~oxide}{ZnO} + 2Ag}$$

== Construction ==
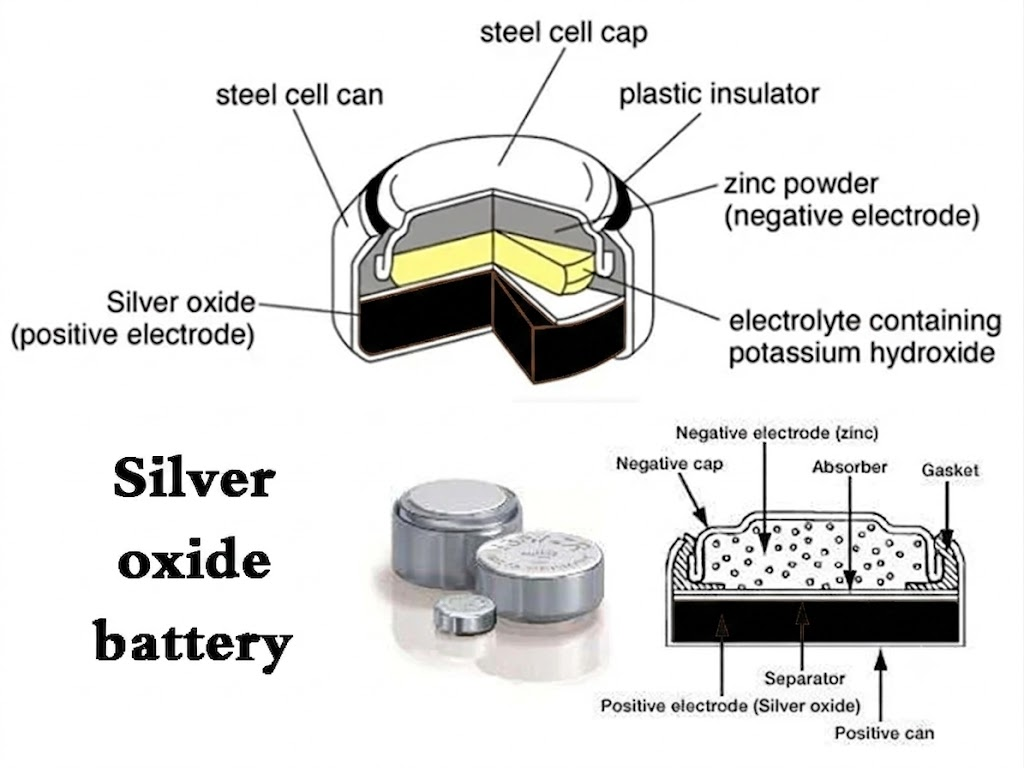
Cross-section of a button silver oxide battery

In order to reduce the cost of manufacture, most commercially available silver oxide cells take the form of button cells with relatively low silver content. These button cells generally follow the same compact design. The bottom portion of the cell is the cathode, which consists of a graphite infused silver oxide. A plastic membrane separates this from an anode of powdered zinc dissolved in an alkaline electrolyte. An insulating gasket keeps the two contacts apart, facilitating the discharge of the cell.

== Mercury content ==
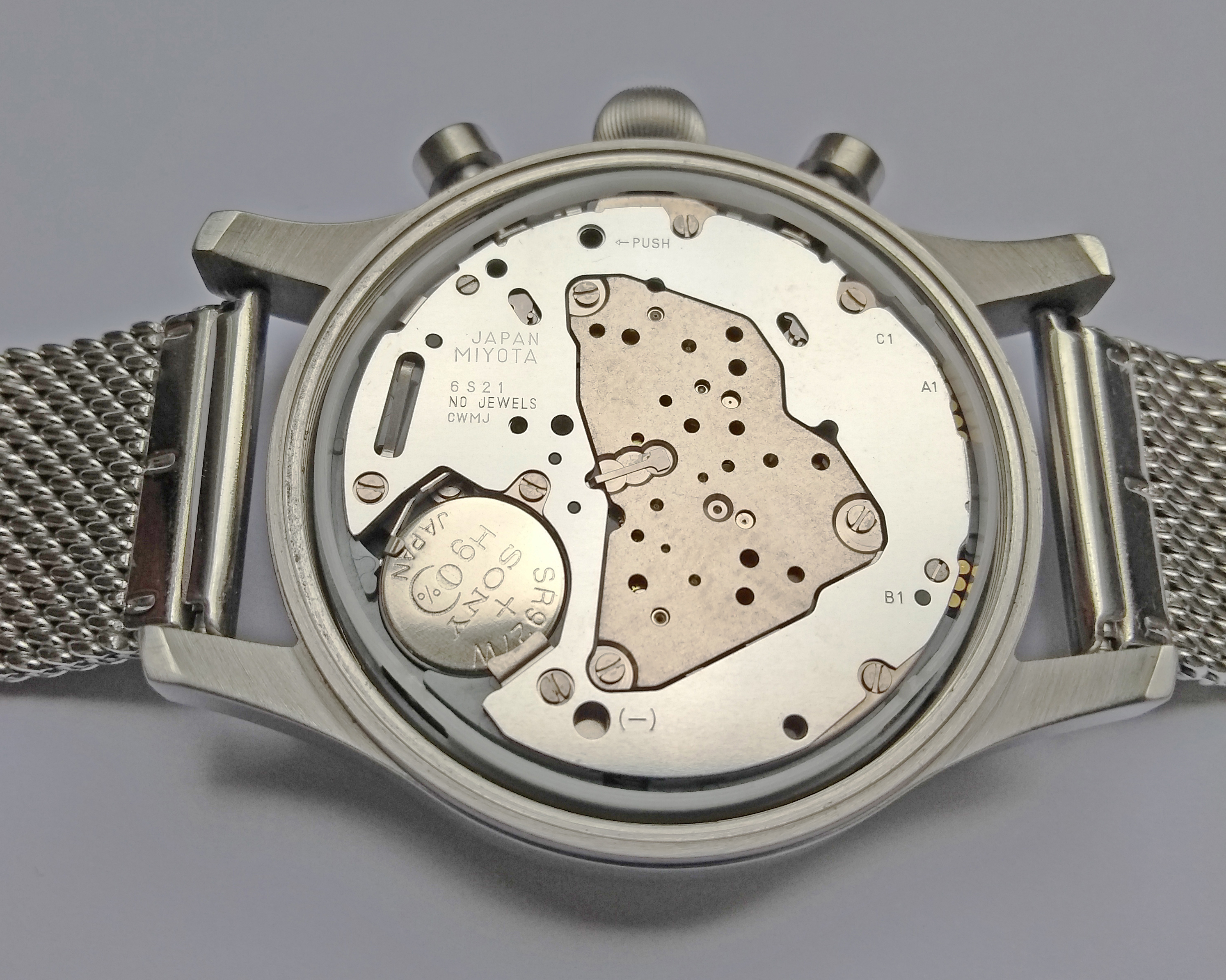
Silver oxide battery used to power a quartz watch movement; battery is marked as containing no mercury

Until 2004, all silver oxide batteries contained up to 0.2% mercury, incorporated into the zinc anode to inhibit corrosion from the alkaline environment. This corrosion would occur regardless of whether or not the battery was providing power, making shelf life an important consideration with silver oxide batteries. Sony started producing the first mercury-free silver oxide batteries in 2004. Regulation in the European Union now dictates that all batteries be virtually mercury-free.

Other safety concerns with silver oxide cells stem from their small size, which often leads to accidental swallowing and poisoning, especially by young children.

== See also ==
- Battery nomenclature
- Battery recycling
- Comparison of battery types
- Fuel cell
- History of the battery
- List of battery sizes
- List of battery types
