= D battery =

Standardized size of a dry cell

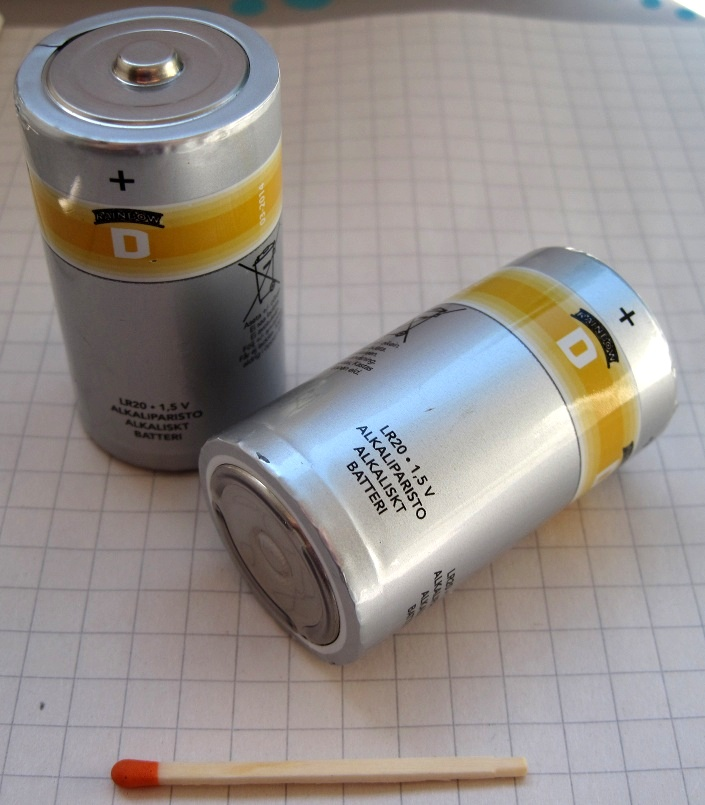
D cell batteries, wooden matchstick for scale.

A D battery (D cell or IEC R20) is a standardized size of a dry cell. A D cell is cylindrical with an electrical contact at each end; the positive end has a nub or bump. D cells are typically used in high current drain applications, such as in large flashlights, radio receivers and transmitters, and other devices that require an extended running time. A D cell may be either rechargeable or non-rechargeable. Its terminal voltage and capacity depend upon its cell chemistry.

The National Carbon Company introduced the first D cell in 1898. Before smaller cells became more common, D cells were widely known as flashlight batteries. The U.S. military designation for this battery has been BA-30 since sometime before World War II. During World War II, it was designated the Type C battery by the U.S. Navy, leading to confusion with the smaller C cell battery (BA-42).

In 2007, D batteries accounted for 8% of alkaline primary battery sales (numerically) in the U.S. In 2008, Swiss purchases of D batteries amounted to 3.4% of primary and 1.4% of secondary (rechargeable) sales.

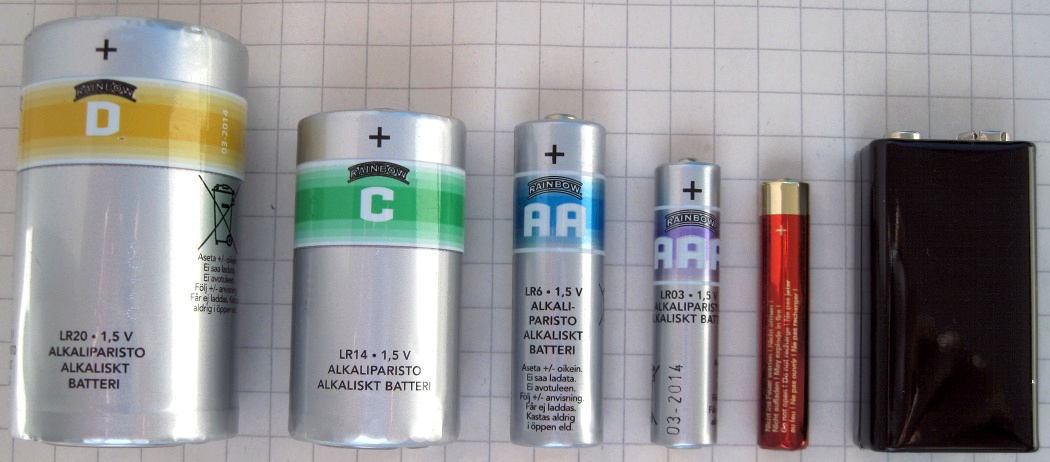
D, C, AA, AAA, AAAA and 9-Volt batteries

== Dimensions and capacity ==
D batteries have a nominal diameter of 33.2 ± 1 millimeters (1.3 inches). The overall length is 61.5 millimeters (2.42 inches).

		Zinc–carbon	Alkaline	Li-FeS_{2}	NiCd	NiMH	Li-SOCl_{2}
IEC name		R20	LR20	FR20	KR20	HR20	ER?
ANSI/NEDA name		13D	13A	13LF	13K	13H	
Typical capacity	milliamphours	8,000 mAh	12,000–18,000 mAh		2,000–5,500 mAh	2,200–12,000 mAh	19,000 mAh
Typical capacity	energy	12 Wh	18–27 Wh		2.5–6.9 Wh	2.75–15 Wh	68.4 Wh
Nominal voltage		1.5 V	1.5 V	1.5 V	1.25 V	1.25 V	3.6 V
Rechargeable		No	Special type only	No	Yes	Yes	No

== Names ==
=== Common ===
Name / Type of this battery	Alkaline	Zinc–carbon	Li-FeS_{2}	Li-SOCl_{2}	NiCd	NiMH
IEC name	LR20	R20	FR20	ER?	KR20	HR20
ANSI/NEDA name	13A	13D	13LF		13K	13H

=== Other ===
- U2 / HP2 / SP2 (UK)
- Type 373 (Russia)
- MN/MX1300
- Mono
- Goliath
- BA-30 (US WWII)
- #1 (China)
- UM 1 (JIS)
- 6135-99-464-1938 / 6135-99-109-9428 (NSN)
- Flashlight Battery / Torch Battery
- B006 (NiMH)
- Torcia (Italy)
- Góliátelem (Hungary)
- Pila Grande (Argentina)
- Kalın Pil (Turkey)
- Monočlánek / "Buřt" (Czech Republic)

== Battery capacity ==
A battery's capacity depends upon its cell chemistry and current draw. Duracell brand rates its alkaline D cell performance as approximately 20,000 mAh at 25 mA draw, but about 10,000 mAh at 500 mA draw. This effect is generally less pronounced in cells with NiMH chemistry and hardly at all with NiCd. Many commonly available size D rechargeable cells are actually sub-C cells in a D-sized holder.

== See also ==
- List of battery sizes
- Battery nomenclature
