= Alkaline battery =

Type of electrical cell

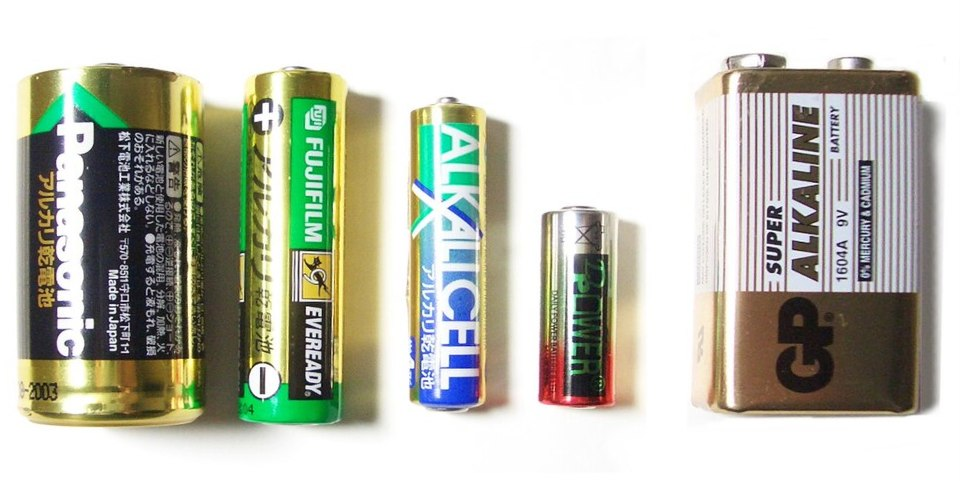
- Size comparison of alkaline batteries (left to right): C, AA, AAA, N, and a 9-volt (PP3).
- Self-discharge rate: <0.3%/month
- Time durability: 5–10 years
- Nominal cell voltage: 1.5 V

An alkaline battery (IEC code: L) is a type of primary battery where the electrolyte (most commonly potassium hydroxide) has a pH value above 7. Typically, these batteries derive energy from the reaction between zinc metal and manganese dioxide.

Compared with zinc–carbon batteries, alkaline batteries have a higher energy density and longer shelf life yet provide the same voltage.

The alkaline battery gets its name because it has an alkaline electrolyte of potassium hydroxide (KOH) instead of the acidic ammonium chloride (NH_{4}Cl) or zinc chloride (ZnCl_{2}) electrolyte of the zinc–carbon batteries. Other battery systems also use alkaline electrolytes, but they use different active materials for the electrodes.

As of 2011, alkaline batteries accounted for 80% of manufactured batteries in the US and over 10 billion individual units produced worldwide. In Japan, alkaline batteries accounted for 46% of all primary battery sales. In Switzerland, alkaline batteries accounted for 68%, in the UK 60% and in the EU 47% of all battery sales including secondary types.

Alkaline batteries contain zinc (Zn) and manganese dioxide (MnO_{2}), which is a cumulative neurotoxin and can be toxic in higher concentrations. However, compared to other battery types, the toxicity of alkaline batteries is moderate.

Alkaline batteries are used in many household items such as portable media players, digital cameras, toys, flashlights, and radios.

== History ==
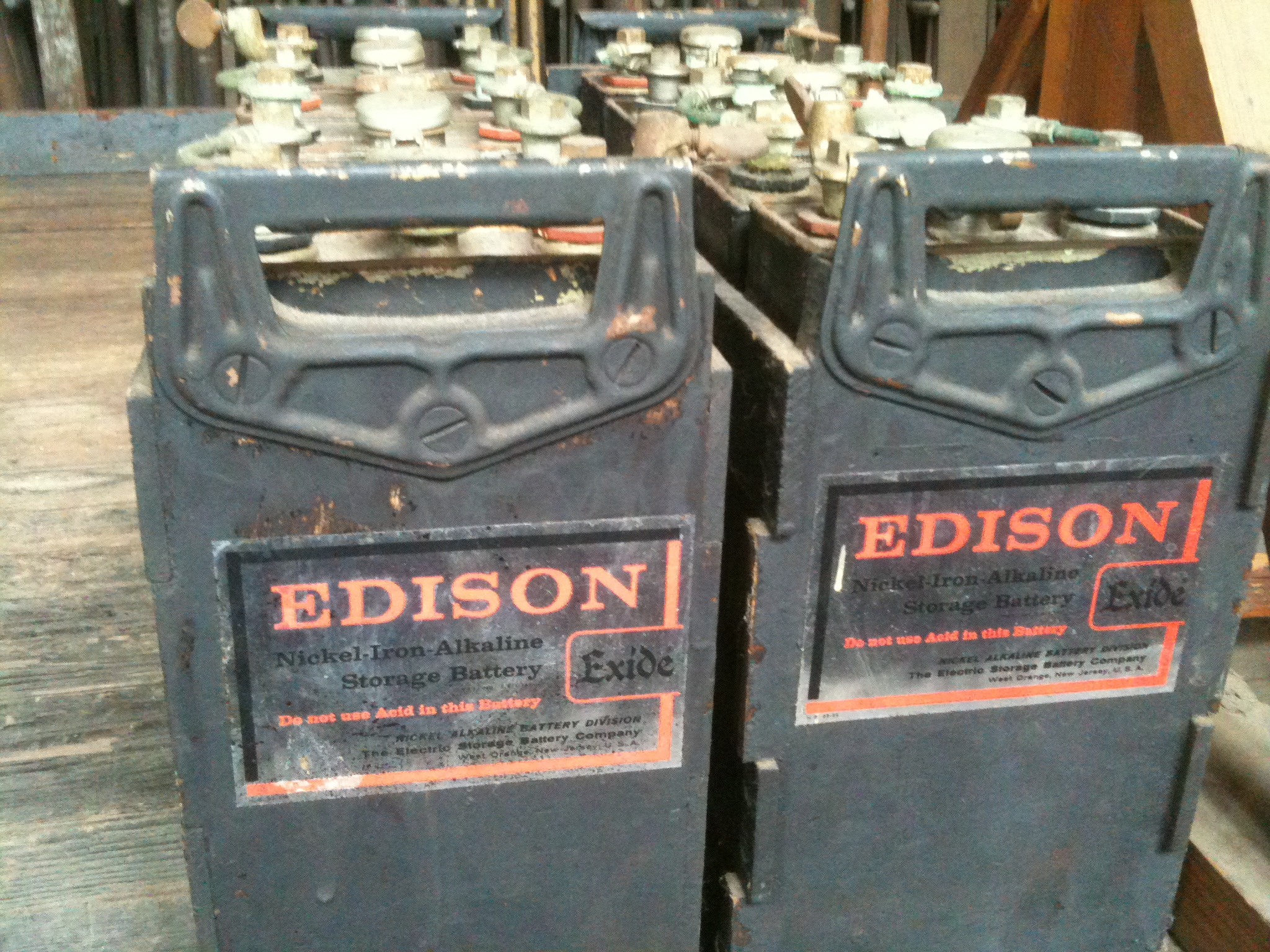
Thomas Edison's nickel–iron batteries manufactured under the "Exide" brand, originally developed in 1901 by Edison, use a potassium hydroxide electrolyte

Batteries with alkaline (rather than acid) electrolyte were first developed by Waldemar Jungner in 1899, and, working independently, Thomas Edison in 1901. The modern alkaline dry battery, using the zinc/manganese dioxide chemistry, was invented by the Canadian engineer Lewis Urry in the 1950s before he started working for Union Carbide's Eveready Battery division in Cleveland, Ohio, building on earlier work by Edison. On October 9, 1957, Urry, Karl Kordesch, and P. A. Marsal filed US patent (2,960,558) for the alkaline battery. It was granted in 1960 and was assigned to Union Carbide.

When alkaline batteries were introduced in the late 1960s, their zinc electrodes (in common with the then ubiquitous carbon-zinc cells) had a surface film of mercury amalgam. Its purpose was to control electrolytic action on impurities in the zinc; that unwanted electrolytic action would reduce shelf life and promote leakage. When reductions in mercury content were mandated by various legislatures, it became necessary to greatly improve the purity and consistency of the zinc.

== Chemistry ==
In an alkaline battery, the negative electrode is zinc and the positive electrode is manganese dioxide (MnO_{2}). The alkaline electrolyte of potassium hydroxide (KOH) is not consumed during the reaction, as there are equal amounts of OH^{−} anions consumed and produced in the two half-reactions occurring at the electrodes. Only zinc and MnO_{2} are consumed during discharge. In terms of formal oxidation state, discharging the battery converts zinc from oxidation state 0 (metallic) to +2, and it converts manganese from oxidation state +4 to +3.

The two half-reactions are:

- Oxidation reaction occurring at the anode, which is negatively charged from accepting e^{−} from the reductant in the cell:
  Zn(s) + 2OH^{−}(aq) → Zn(OH)_{2}(s) + 2e^{−} → ZnO(s) + H_{2}O(l) + 2e^{−} (E°_{ox} = +1.28 V)
- Reduction reaction occurring at the cathode, which is positively charged from giving e^{−} to the oxidizer in the cell:
  2MnO_{2}(s) + 2H_{2}O(l) + 2e^{−} → 2MnO(OH)(s) + 2OH^{−}(aq)

The overall reaction (sum of the anodic and cathodic reactions) is:

Zn(s) + 2MnO_{2}(s) + H_{2}O(l) ⇄ ZnO(s) + 2MnO(OH)(s) (E°_{cell} = E°_{ox} + E°_{red} = nominally +1.5 V)

== Capacity ==
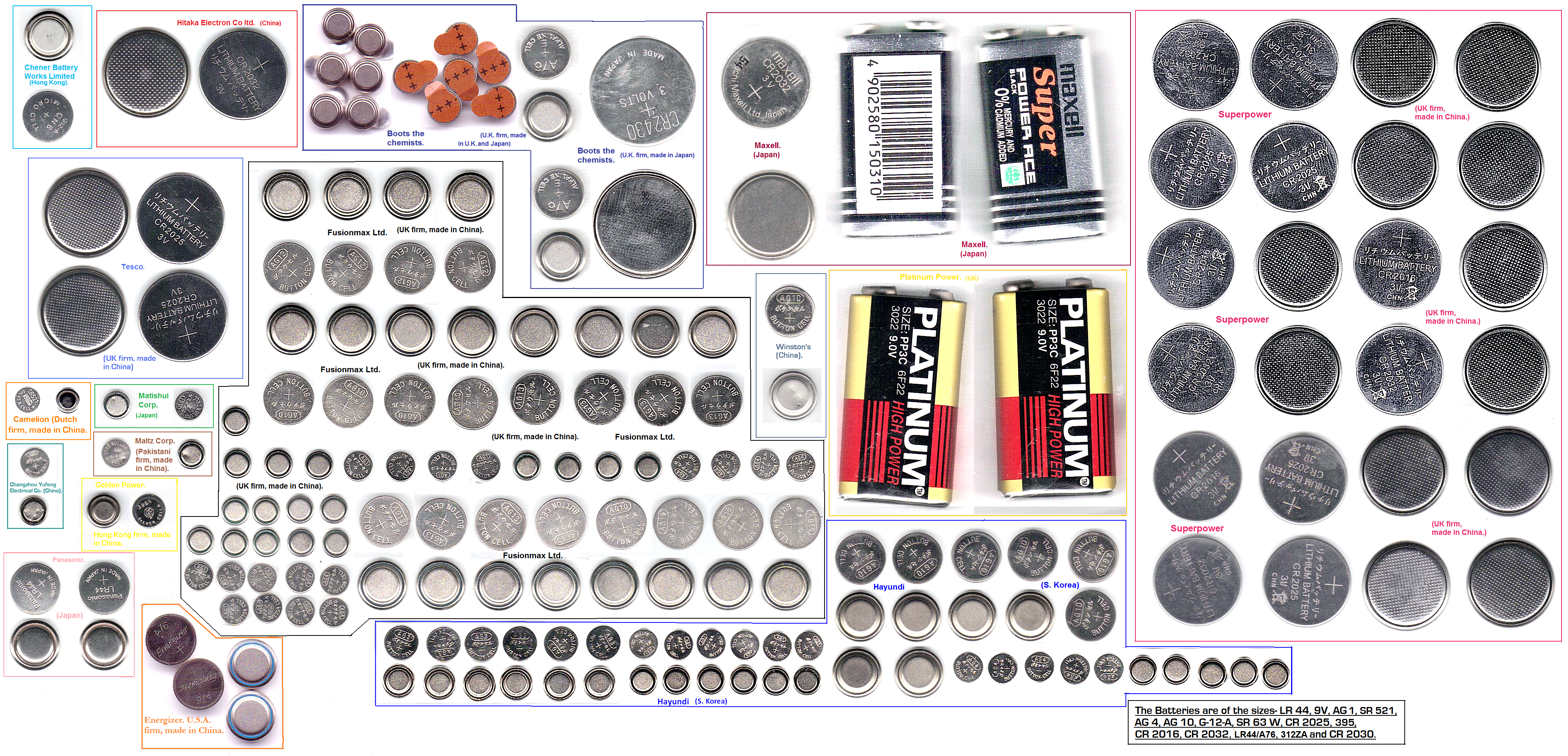
Several sizes of button and coin cells. Some are alkaline and others are silver oxide. Two 9 V batteries were added as a size comparison. Enlarge to see the size code markings.

The capacity (in Ampere-hours) of an alkaline battery is strongly dependent on the load. An AA-sized alkaline battery might have an effective capacity of 3000 mAh at low drain, but at a load of 1 ampere, which is common for digital cameras, the capacity could be as little as 700 mAh. The voltage of the battery declines steadily during use, so the total usable capacity depends on the cutoff voltage of the application.

== Voltage ==
The nominal voltage of a fresh alkaline cell as established by manufacturer standards is 1.5 V. The actual zero-load voltage of a new alkaline battery ranges from 1.50 to 1.65 V, depending on the purity of the manganese dioxide used and the contents of zinc oxide in the electrolyte. The voltage delivered to a load decreases as the current drawn increases and as the cell discharges. A cell is considered fully discharged when the voltage drops to about 0.9 V. Cells connected in series produce a voltage equal to the sum of the voltages of each cell (e.g., three cells generate about 4.5 V when new).

AA battery voltage vs capacity, at zero-load and 330 mW load
Capacity (%)	100	90	80	70	60	50	40	30	20	10	0
Zero-load (V)	1.59	1.44	1.38	1.34	1.32	1.30	1.28	1.26	1.23	1.20	1.10
at 330 mW (V)	1.49	1.35	1.27	1.20	1.16	1.12	1.10	1.08	1.04	0.98	0.62

== Current ==
The amount of electrical current an alkaline battery can deliver is roughly proportional to its physical size. This is a result of decreasing internal resistance as the internal surface area of the cell increases. A rule of thumb is that an AA alkaline battery can deliver 700 mA without any significant heating. Larger cells, such as C and D cells, can deliver more current. Applications requiring currents of several amperes such as powerful portable audio equipment require D-sized cells to handle the increased load.

In comparison, Lithium-ion and Ni-MH batteries can handle 2 amperes with ease on the standard AA size.

== Construction ==
Alkaline battery

Alkaline batteries are manufactured in standard cylindrical forms interchangeable with zinc–carbon batteries, and in button forms. Several individual cells may be interconnected to form a true "battery", such as the 9-volt PP3-size battery.

A cylindrical cell is contained in a drawn stainless steel can, which is the cathode connection. The positive electrode mixture is a compressed paste of manganese dioxide with carbon powder added for increased conductivity. The paste may be pressed into the can or deposited as pre-molded rings. The hollow center of the cathode is lined with a separator, which prevents contact of the electrode materials and short-circuiting of the cell. The separator is made of a non-woven layer of cellulose or a synthetic polymer. The separator must conduct ions and remain stable in the highly alkaline electrolyte solution.

The negative electrode is composed of a dispersion of zinc powder in a gel containing the potassium hydroxide electrolyte. The zinc powder provides more surface area for chemical reactions to take place, compared to a metal can. This lowers the internal resistance of the cell. To prevent gassing of the cell at the end of its life, more manganese dioxide is used than required to react with all the zinc. Also, a plastic-made gasket is usually added to increase leakage resistance.

The cell is then wrapped in aluminium foil, a plastic film, or rarely, cardboard, which acts as a final layer of leak protection as well as providing a surface on which logos and labels can be printed.

When describing AAA, AA, C, sub-C and D size cells, the negative electrode is connected to the flat end, and the positive terminal is the end with the raised button. This is usually reversed in button cells, with the flat-ended cylindrical can being the positive terminal.

== Recharging of alkaline batteries ==
Some alkaline batteries are designed to be recharged a few times, and are described as rechargeable alkaline batteries. Attempts to recharge standard alkaline batteries may cause rupture, or the leaking of hazardous liquids that corrode the equipment. However, it is reported that standard alkaline batteries can often be recharged a few times (typically not more than ten), albeit with reduced capacity after each charge; chargers are available commercially. The UK consumer organisation named Which? reported that it tested two such chargers with Energizer alkaline batteries, finding that battery capacity dropped on average to 10% of its original value, with huge variations, after two cycles (without stating how depleted they were before recharging) after recharging them two times.

In 2017, Gautam G. Yadav published papers reporting that alkaline batteries made by interleaving the interlayers with copper ions could be recharged for over 6,000 cycles due to the theoretical second electron capacity of manganese dioxide. The energy density of these rechargeable batteries with copper intercalated manganese dioxide is reported to be over 160 Wh/L, the best among the aqueous-based chemistries. It could be capable of energy densities comparable to lithium-ion (at least 250 Wh/L) if zinc utilization in the batteries were improved.

== Leaks ==
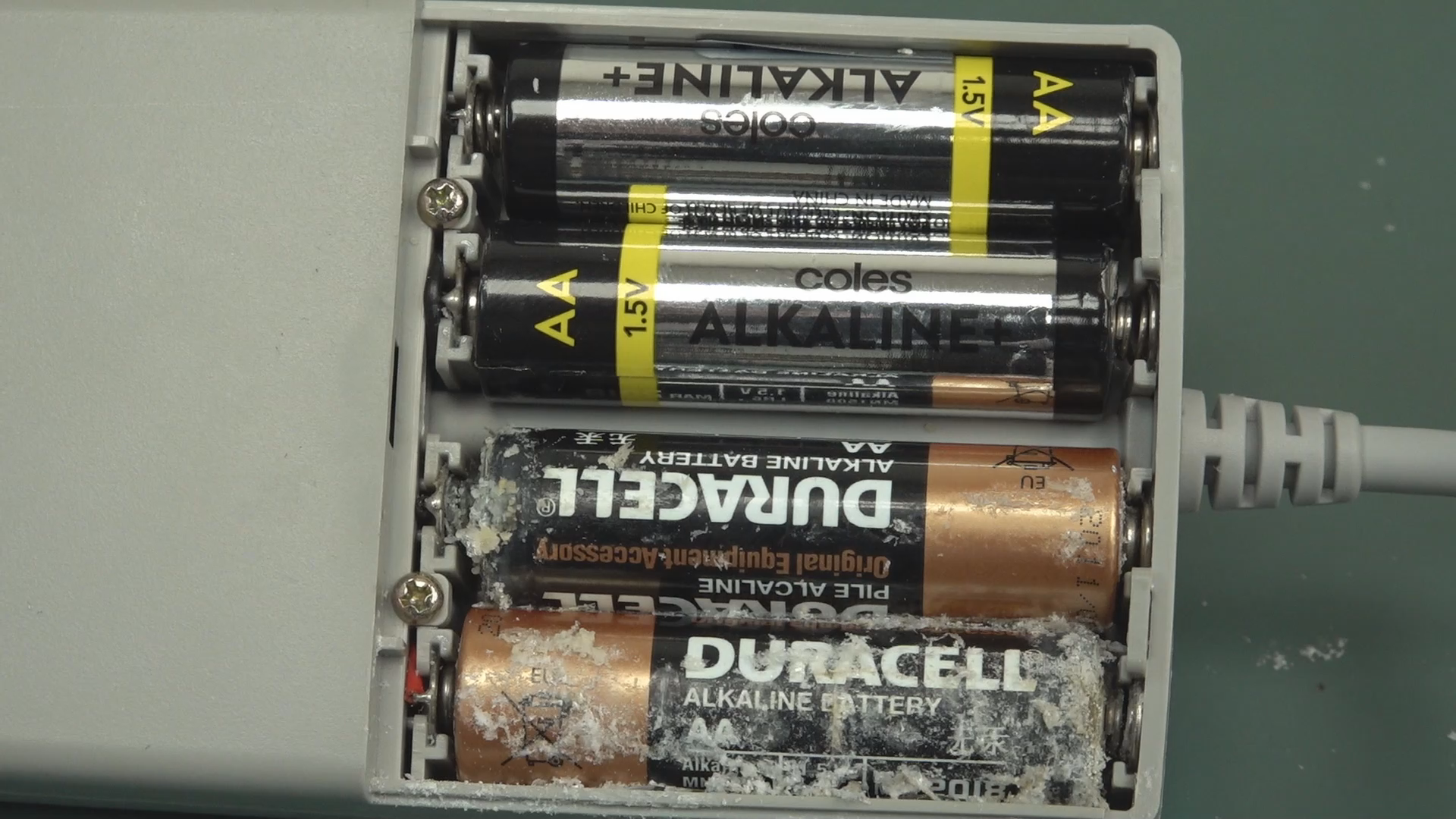
Potassium compound leakage inside an alkaline battery

Alkaline batteries are prone to leaking potassium hydroxide, a caustic agent that can cause respiratory, eye and skin irritation. (Note: This alkali particularly attacks aluminium, a common material for flashlights, which can be damaged by leaking alkaline batteries.) The risk of this can be reduced by storing batteries in a dry place and at room temperature. Damage from leakage is mitigated by removing batteries when storing devices. Applying reverse current (such as by recharging disposable-grade cells, or by mixing batteries of different types or state of charge in the same device) can increase the risk of leakage.

All batteries gradually self-discharge (whether installed in a device or not) and dead batteries eventually leak. Extremely high temperatures can also cause batteries to rupture and leak (such as in a car during summer) as well as decrease the shelf life of the battery.

The reason for leaks is that as batteries discharge – either through usage or gradual self-discharge – the chemistry of the cells changes and some hydrogen gas is generated. This out-gassing increases pressure in the battery. Eventually, the excess pressure either ruptures the insulating seals at the end of the battery, or the outer metal canister, or both. In addition, as the battery ages, its steel outer canister may gradually corrode or rust, which can further contribute to containment failure.

Once a leak has formed due to corrosion of the outer steel shell, potassium hydroxide absorbs carbon dioxide from the air to form a feathery crystalline structure of potassium carbonate that grows and spreads out from the battery over time, following along metal electrodes to circuit boards where it commences oxidation of copper tracks and other components, leading to permanent circuitry damage.

The leaking crystalline growths can also emerge from seams around battery covers to form a furry coating outside the device, that corrodes any objects in contact with the leaking device.

== Recycling and disposal ==
Alkaline batteries made prior to 1996 may contain mercury, and are considered hazardous waste. Despite no longer containing mercury, alkaline batteries still contain other heavy metals and corrosive chemicals, which can cause problems in landfills. The batteries can cause fires or explosions, which can threaten the safety of sanitation workers. Batteries in landfills can leach toxic chemicals into the soil and water. Recycling also reduces the amount of new materials and energy needed for batteries and other products, reducing environmental damage from mining and other production.

Disposal varies by jurisdiction. For example, the state of California considers all batteries as hazardous waste when discarded, and has banned the disposal of batteries in domestic waste. In Europe, battery disposal is controlled by the WEEE Directive and Battery Directive regulations, and as such alkaline batteries must not be thrown in with domestic waste. In the EU, most stores that sell batteries are required by law to accept old batteries for recycling.

The disposable battery market grows at a rate of 5.5% every year. In the past, used batteries ended up at landfill sites, but in 2004, disposal of alkaline batteries at landfill sites was forbidden by an EU regulation. In 2006, the EU committed to recycling 45% of all batteries by 2016. In 2023, a new regulation set a target of 63% by 2027 and 73% by 2036. The United States Environmental Protection Agency recommends recycling alkaline batteries with a battery recycler or local waste disposal.

In the US, only California requires all alkaline batteries to be recycled. However, Vermont has a statewide alkaline battery collection program. Many retailers will accept batteries for recycling, such as Batteries Plus, Home Depot, Staples, and IKEA. However, some stores that advertise battery recycling, such as Best Buy, only accept rechargeable batteries, and generally do not accept alkaline batteries. It is also possible to purchase battery recycling kits to ship batteries to recyclers. Recycling database websites such as Call2Recycle, Greener Gadgets, Earth911, and Green Citizen list where batteries can be recycled.

When recycled, the metals from crushed alkaline batteries are mechanically separated, and the waste black mass is treated chemically to separate zinc, manganese dioxide and potassium hydroxide.

== See also ==
- Battery holder
- Battery nomenclature
- Battery recycling
- Comparison of battery types
- Edison–Lalande cell (an early alkaline primary battery)
- History of the battery
- List of battery sizes
- List of battery types
- Lewis Urry
- Oxyride battery
- Rechargeable battery
- Rechargeable alkaline battery
