= C battery =

Standard size of dry cell battery

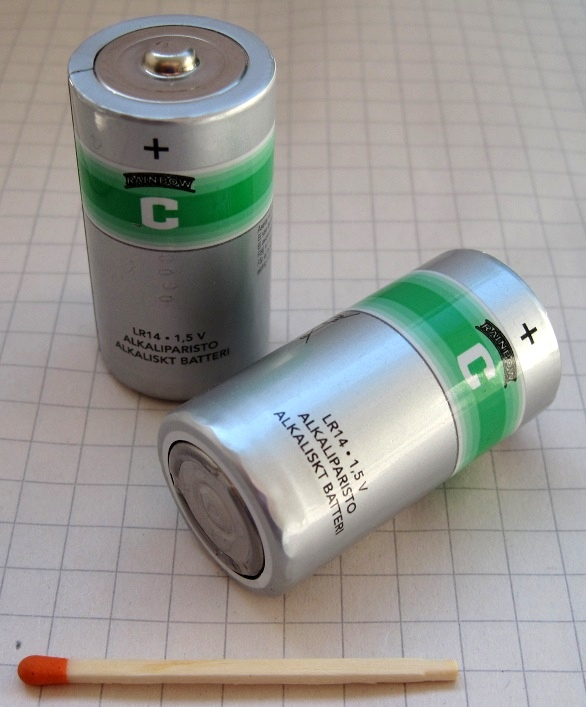
Two C-size batteries

The C battery (C size battery or R14 battery) is a standard size of dry cell battery typically used in medium-drain applications such as toys, modern boomboxes, flashlights, and musical instruments.

As of 2007, C batteries accounted for 4% of alkaline primary battery sales in the United States. In Switzerland as of 2008, C batteries totalled 5.4% of primary battery sales and 3.4% of secondary (rechargeable) battery sales.

== Properties ==
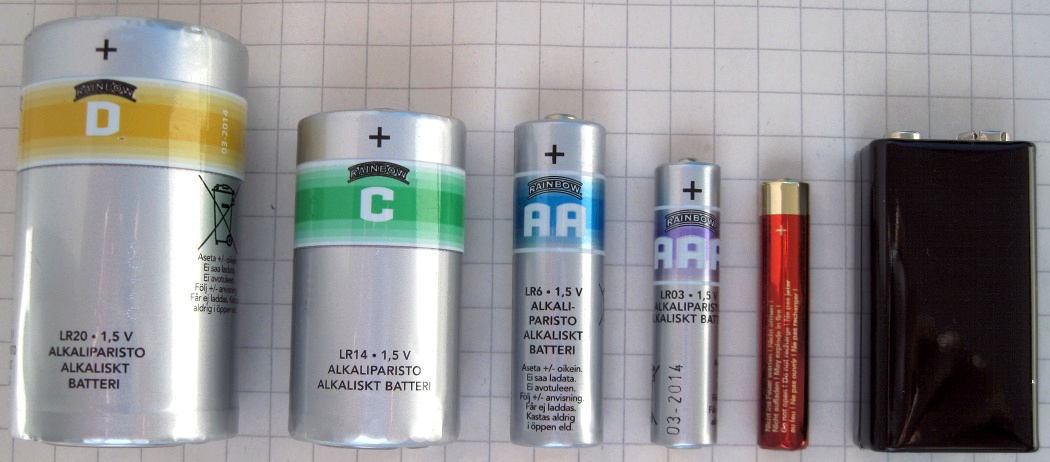
D, C, AA, AAA, AAAA & 9-volt batteries

A C battery measures 50 mm (1.97 in) length and 26.2 mm (1.03 in) diameter.

The voltage and capacity of a C-size battery depends on the battery chemistry and discharge conditions. The nominal voltage is 1.5V. Alkaline C batteries have a storage capacity up to 8000 mAh while rechargeable NiMH C batteries can hold up to 6000 mAh. Zinc-carbon C batteries usually hold up to 3800 mAh. Compared to the AAA and AA batteries, C-batteries' storage capacities are significantly higher.

== Standardisation ==
Like the D battery, the C battery size has been standardized since the 1920s. The AA, AAA, and N sizes have been in common use since the 1950s. It is descended from the old No. 1 dry cell battery for flashlights which was of a similar size, originally the zinc casing was formed around a broom handle.

The C battery is called "14" in current ANSI standards of battery nomenclature, and in IEC standards is designated "R14".

== Other common names ==
- U11 (In Britain until the 1980s)
- MN1400
- MX1400
- Baby
- Bébielem (Hungary)
- Type 343 (Soviet Union/Russia)
- BA-42 (US Military Spec World War II–1980s)
- UM 2 (JIS)
- No. 2 (China)
- 6135-99-199-4779 (NSN) (carbon-zinc)
- 6135-99-117-3212 (NSN) (alkaline)
- HP-11
- Mezza torcia (Italy)
- Pila Mediana (Argentina)
- Pilha média (Brazil)
- Orta Pil / Orta boy pil (Turkey)
- Pin Trung (Vietnam)

== See also ==
- Battery holder
- List of battery sizes
