= National Electronic Distributors Association =

American electronics trade organization

- Type: Organization
- Industry: Association
- Founded: 1981; 45 years ago
- Defunct: 2010
- Fate: Dormant, merged with Electronic Industries Alliance
- Successor: Electronic Components Industry Association

Logo of the National Electronic Distributors Association

The National Electronic Distributors Association (NEDA) was a trade association in the United States representing manufacturers and distributors of electronic components.

The association cooperated in standardization of names for components, such as batteries and provided industry guidance on such subjects as 1-Dimensional Bar code & 2-Dimensional Matrix Code Product Package & Shipment Labeling, date code restrictions, and other packaging options. NEDA was an advocate for the authorized distribution of electronic components and parts and was active in formulating anti-counterfeiting policies and establishing a website providing an authorized electronics inventory search. NEDA is often cited by American manufacturers, along with ANSI, for names of components.

NEDA merged with the Electronic Components Association in 2010 to form the Electronic Components Industry Association (ECIA).
