= 27A (disambiguation) =

27A may refer to:

- 27A, a 1974 Australian drama film directed by Esben Storm
- 27A, a variant name for the A27 battery
- RS-27A, a liquid-fuel rocket engine developed in 1980s by Rocketdyne for use on the Delta II and Delta III launch vehicles
- Truro 27A, a Mi'kmaq reserve located in Colchester County, Nova Scotia.
- New York State Route 27A. a state highway
- Fairchild F-27A, variant of the Fokker F27 Friendship twin-engined turboprop passenger aircraft
- North Carolina Highway 27A (Thrift) section of the North Carolina Highway 27
- North Carolina Highway 27A (Pee Dee) section of the North Carolina Highway 27

== See also ==
- A27 (disambiguation)
