= 12-volt battery =

12-volt battery may refer to:

- Automotive battery
- Lantern battery
- A23 battery, for RF transmitters
