= AC/DC receiver design =

Type of power supply

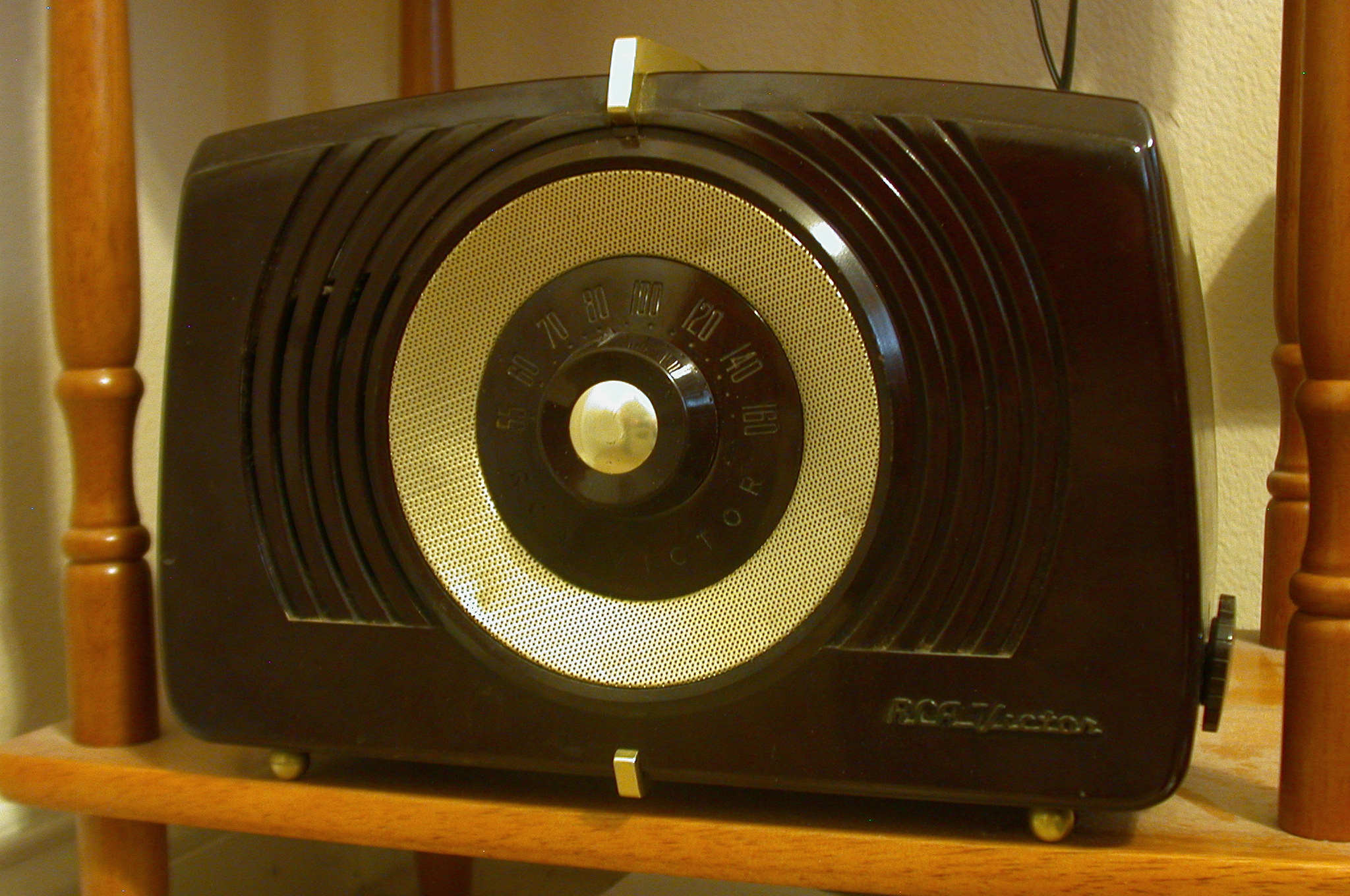
- An "All American Five" vacuum tube radio, a classic example of an AC/DC design.
- Component type: Power supply design for vacuum tube receivers
- Invention year: 1930s

An AC/DC receiver design is a style of power supply of vacuum tube radio or television receivers that eliminated the bulky and expensive AC-only mains transformer. Having no mains transformer, receivers could operate from a DC supply as well as an AC supply (i.e., "AC/DC"), a feature which became less important as DC domestic electricity fell out of use. The design was maintained regardless due to its lower cost.

== Applicability to early radio and television ==
In the early days of radio, mains electricity was supplied at different voltages in different places, and either direct current (DC) or alternating current (AC) was supplied. There are three ways of powering electronic equipment. AC-only equipment would rely on a transformer to provide the voltages for heater and plate circuits. AC/DC equipment would connect all the tube heaters in series to match the supply voltage; a rectifier would convert AC to the direct current required for operation. When connected to a DC supply, the rectifier stage of the power supply performed no active function. DC-only equipment would only run from a DC supply and included no rectifier stage. DC is no longer (or extremely rarely) used for mains power distribution.

Different radio set models were required for AC, DC mains, and battery operation. For example, a 1933 Murphy radio with essentially the same circuit had different models for AC supply, DC supply, and battery operation. The introduction of AC/DC circuitry allowed a single model to be used on either AC or DC mains as a selling point, and some such models added "Universal" to their name (such sets usually had user-settable voltage tapping arrangements to cater for the wide range of voltages).

The first AC/DC design of radio was the All American Five. The sole aim of the design was to eliminate the mains transformer. The lower cost of transformerless designs remained popular with manufacturers long after DC power distribution had disappeared. Several models were produced which dispensed with the power transformer, but had circuit features which only allowed operation from AC. Some early models were available in both AC-only and AC/DC versions, with the AC/DC versions sometimes slightly more expensive.

Television receivers were first commercially sold in England in 1936 for the new 'Television Service' broadcast by the British Broadcasting Corporation. All pre World War II sets used mains transformers and consequently were AC only. In 1948 Pye released the first television receiver, the B18T, to employ the AC/DC design to eliminate the mains transformer when operated off 240 V mains. While sufficient for radio, the voltage was not high enough to power some television circuits, so energy was recovered during the flyback period from the primary of the line output transformer to provide a boosted HT supply; this was not possible with a lower mains supply voltage—even 220 V was insufficient. Pye's marketing material did not mention the set's ability to operate from a DC supply, possibly because there were no DC supplies within the reception range of Alexandra Palace television station, then Britain's only operating transmitter. Other manufacturers adopted the design; they, and later also Pye, sold them as AC/DC sets; the technique was used for many decades. Later designs were able to operate from 220 Vac; as a typical example Philips sold the AC/DC Fapesa TV-9 in Argentina c. 1965, a country with nominal 220 Vac mains (often lower in practice).

=== Series tube heaters ===
Vacuum tube equipment used a number of tubes, each with a heater requiring a certain amount of electrical power. In AC/DC equipment, the heaters of all the tubes are connected in series. All the tubes are rated at the same current (typically 100, 150, 300, or 450 mA) but at different voltages, according to their heating power requirements. If necessary, resistance (which can be a ballast tube (barretter), a power resistor or a resistive mains lead are added so that, when the mains voltage is applied across the chain, the specified heating current flows. Some types of ballast resistors were built into an envelope like a tube that was easily replaceable. With mains voltages of around 220 V, the power dissipated by the additional resistance and the voltage drop across it could be quite high, and it was common to use a resistive power cable (mains cord) of defined resistance, running warm, rather than putting a hot resistor inside the case. If a resistive power cable was used, an inexperienced repairer might replace it with a standard cable, or use the wrong length, damaging the equipment and risking a fire.

=== Transformer ===
AC/DC equipment did not require a transformer, and was consequently cheaper, lighter, and smaller than comparable AC equipment. This type of equipment continued to be produced long after AC became the universal standard due to its cost advantage over AC-only, and was only discontinued when vacuum tubes were replaced by low-voltage solid-state electronics.

A rectifier and a filter capacitor were connected directly to the mains. If the mains power was AC, the rectifier converted it to DC. If it was DC, the rectifier effectively acted as a conductor. When operating on DC, the voltage available was reduced by the voltage drop across the rectifier. Because an AC waveform has a voltage peak that is higher than the average value produced by the rectifier, the same set operating on the same root mean square AC supply voltage would have a higher effective voltage after the rectifier stage. In areas using 110–120 volt AC, a simple half-wave rectifier limited the maximum plate voltage that could be developed; this was adequate for relatively low-power audio equipment, but television receivers or higher-powered amplifiers required either a more complex voltage doubler rectifier or warranted the use of a power transformer with a conveniently high secondary voltage. Areas with 220–240 volt AC supplies could develop higher plate voltage with a simple rectifier. Transformerless power supplies were feasible for television receivers in 220–240 volt areas. Additionally, the use of a transformer allowed multiple independent power supplies from separate transformer windings for different stages.

In an AC/DC design there was no transformer to isolate the equipment from the mains. Much equipment was built on a metal chassis which was connected to one side of the mains. Because no power transformer was used, "hot chassis" construction was required: one of the mains power lines became the negative side of the power supply, connected to the chassis, and all metal parts in metallic contact with it, as common "ground". With AC power, the neutral, rather than live, line should be connected to the chassis; touching it, while highly undesirable, is usually relatively safe—the neutral conductor is normally at or near earth potential. But if used with a two-pin power plug (or an incorrectly wired three-pin one), any metal that the user could touch was an electrocution hazard, connected to mains live. Consequently equipment was made with no metal connected to the chassis exposed even in predictable abnormal situations, such as when a plastic knob came off a metal shaft, or small fingers poked through ventilation holes. Service personnel working on energized equipment had to use an isolation transformer for safety, or be mindful that the chassis could be live. AC-only vacuum tube equipment used a bulky, heavy, and expensive transformer, but the chassis was not connected to the supply conductors and could be earthed, making for safe operation.

Transformerless "hot chassis" televisions continued to be commonly manufactured long after transistorisation rendered live-chassis design obsolete in radios. By the 1990s, inclusion of audio-video input jacks required elimination of the floating ground as TVs needed to be interconnectable with VCRs, game consoles and video disc players. The widespread replacement of cathode ray tubes with liquid crystal displays after the turn of the millennium resulted in televisions using primarily low voltages, obtained from switching power supplies. The potentially-hazardous "floating chassis" was no more.

=== Regional variations ===
In the past, 110–120 V was not high enough for higher-power tube audio and television applications, and only suitable to operate low-power radio and audio equipment such as radio receivers. Higher-powered 110–120 V audio or television equipment needed higher voltages, which were obtained using a step-up transformer based power supply, or sometimes an AC voltage doubler, therefore operating off AC only.

Some AC/DC equipment was designed to be switchable to be able to operate off either 110 V AC (possibly with a voltage doubler) or 220–240 V AC or DC. Television receivers were produced which could run off 240 V AC or DC. The voltage was not high enough to power some circuits, so energy was recovered during the flyback period from the primary of the line output transformer to provide a boosted HT (vacuum tube) (high tension) supply. In a typical vacuum tube colour TV set, the line output stage had to boost its own HT supply to between 900 and 1200 volts (depending on screen size and design). Transistor line output stages, although not requiring supply voltages above the rectified mains voltage, nevertheless still developed extra voltage over the normal supply rail to avoid complicating the power supply circuitry. A typical transistor stage would produce between 20 and 50 'extra' volts. Some details of the way in which the nominally 190 volts HT supply was boosted to nearly 500 volts in the 1951 Bush TV22 are described in a technical publication. AC/DC televisions were produced well into the color and semiconductor era (some sets were tube/semiconductor hybrids).

== Transistor radios ==
With widespread adoption of solid-state design in the 1970s, voltage and power requirements for tabletop portable radio receivers dropped significantly. One common approach was to design a battery-powered radio (typically 6 volts DC from four dry cells) but include a small built-in step down transformer and rectifier to allow mains electricity (120 V or 240 V AC, depending on region) as an alternative to battery-powered operation.
