= List of battery sizes =

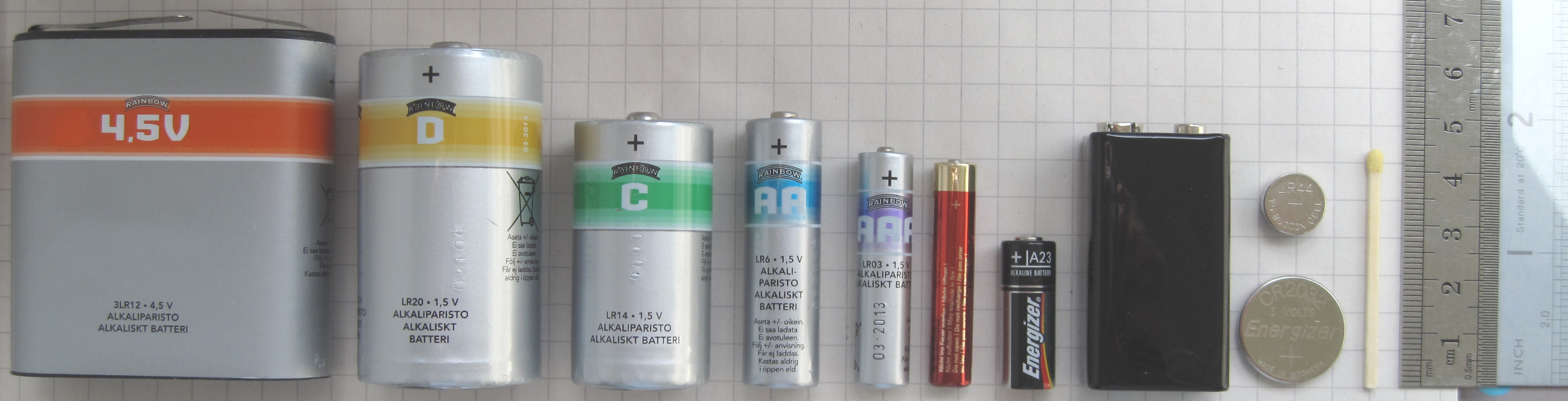
3LR12 (4.5-volt), D, C, AA, AAA, AAAA(1.5-volt), A23 (12-volt), 9V (PP3), CR2032 (3-volt), and LR44 (1.5-volt) batteries (Matchstick for reference)

This is a list of the sizes, shapes, and general characteristics of some common primary and secondary battery types in household, automotive and light industrial use.

The complete nomenclature for a battery specifies size, chemistry, terminal arrangement, and special characteristics. The same physically interchangeable cell size or battery size may have widely different characteristics; physical interchangeability is not the sole factor in substituting a battery.

The full battery designation identifies not only the size, shape and terminal layout of the battery but also the chemistry (and therefore the voltage per cell) and the number of cells in the battery. For example, a CR123 battery is always LiMnO_{2} ('Lithium') chemistry, in addition to its unique size.

The following tables give the common battery chemistry types for the current common sizes of batteries. See Battery chemistry for a list of other electrochemical systems.

== Cylindrical batteries ==
Image (AA cell or matchstick for scale)	Names					Typical capacity (mAh)	Nominal voltage (V)	Size, dia. × h. (mm)	Comments
Image (AA cell or matchstick for scale)	Most common	Other common	IEC	ANSI	NSN	Typical capacity (mAh)	Nominal voltage (V)	Size, dia. × h. (mm)	Comments
	AAAA	MX2500; Mini; UM 6 (JIS) 単6 #9 (China)	LR8D425 (alkaline)	25A (alkaline)		625 (alkaline); 400-600 (NiMH)	1.5 1.2 (NiMH)	8.3 × 42.5	Sometimes used in pen flashlights, laser pointers, powered styluses, calculators, fishing lures.
	AAA	U16 or HP16 (In the UK); Micro; Microlight; MN2400; MX2400; MV2400; Type 286 (Soviet Union/Russia); UM 4 (JIS)(carbon-zinc) 単4; AM-4 (JIS)(alkaline) #7 (China)	LR03 (alkaline); R03 (carbon–zinc); FR03 (LiFeS_{2}); HR03 (NiMH); KR03 (NiCd); ZR03 (NiOOH)	24A (alkaline); 24D (carbon–zinc); 24LF (LiFeS_{2})	6135-66-046-2599 (Australia) 6135-14-425-5849 (France) 6135-22-210-5836 (Denmark) 6135-99-117-3143 (United Kingdom) 6135-15-052-5343 (Italy) 6135-01-601-5817 (United States) 6135-00-826-4798 (United States) 6135-12-162-9946 (Germany) 6140-15-219-3801 (Italy)	1,200 (alkaline); 540 (carbon–zinc); 800–1,200 (NiMH); 500 (NiZn)	1.5 1.2 (NiMH, NiCd)	10.5 × 44.5 (0.41 × 1.75)	Introduced 1911, but added to ANSI standard in 1959 Used in many household electronic devices.
	AA	U12 or HP7 (In the UK); Pencil-sized; Penlight; Mignon; MN1500; MX1500; MV1500; Type 316 (Soviet Union/Russia); UM 3 単3 (JIS)(carbon-zinc); AM-3 (JIS)(alkaline) #5 (China)	LR6 (alkaline); R6 (carbon–zinc); FR6 (LiFeS_{2}); HR6 (NiMH); KR6 (NiCd); ZR6 (NiOOH)	15A (alkaline); 15D (carbon–zinc); 15LF (LiFeS_{2}); 1.2H2 (NiMH); 1.2K2 (NiCd)	6135-15-051-9613 (Italy) 6135-66-037-7956 (Australia) 6135-19-003-8038 (Brazil) 6135-14-304-9752 (France) 6135-01-601-5818 (United States) 6135-99-195-6708 (United Kingdom) 6135-21-844-0864 (Canada) 6135-00-985-7845 (United States) 6135-99-052-0009 (United Kingdom)	2,700 (alkaline); 1,100 (carbon–zinc); 3,000 (LiFeS_{2}); 1,700–2,800 (NiMH); 600–1,000 (NiCd); 1,500 (NiZn)	1.5 1.2 (NiMH, NiCd)	14.5 × 50.5 (0.57 × 1.99)	Introduced 1907, but added to ANSI standard sizes in 1947. Used in many household electronic devices. Various fractional sizes are available; e.g.: 4/5AA (FLYCO Ni-Cd, Ni-Mh, 600–1,500 capacity, 14.0 × 40.0), used in small electronics, such as electric shavers. 1/2AA (see below)
	1/2AA	SAFT LS14250; Tadiran TL5101; UL142502P	CR14250 (LiMnO_{2}); ER14250 (LiSOCl_{2})		6135-01-669-4691 (United States) 6135-01-435-4921 (United States) 6135-14-469-5737 (France) 6135-01-370-2599 (United States) 6135-14-476-8989 (France) 6135-14-484-0910 (France) 6135-01-411-3212 (United States) 6135-14-483-5610 (France) 6135-99-957-5803 (United Kingdom) 6135-12-337-5754 (Germany)	850–1,200	3 (LiMnO_{2}); 3.6 (LiSOCl_{2})	14.0 × 25.0 (nom.); 14.5 × 25.0 (max.)	Same diameter as AA battery, used in small electronics, including pulse oximeters, as well as use in some computer models (such as most pre-Intel Macintosh models and some older IBM PC compatibles) as the CMOS battery. Also used in US military MILES gear and DAGR. Also used in Renishaw Probes, commonly used in CNC machines, such like ones from Haas Automation.
	A		R23 (carbon‑zinc); LR23 (alkaline) #4 (China)				1.5	17 × 50	More common as a NiCd or NiMH cell size than a primary size, popular in older laptop batteries and hobby battery packs. Various fractional sizes are also available; e.g., 2/3 A and 4/5 A.
	B	U10 (UK); 336 (Russian Federation) #3 (China)	R12 (carbon‑zinc); LR12 (alkaline)			8,350 (alkaline)	1.5	21.5 × 60	Most commonly found within a European 4.5-volt lantern battery. Not to be confused with the vacuum tube B battery.
	C	U11 or HP11 (In the UK); MN1400; MX1400; Baby; Type 343 (Soviet Union/Russia); BA-42 (US Military Spec WWII–1980s); UM 2 (JIS) 単2 #2 (China)	LR14 (alkaline); R14 (carbon–zinc); HR14 (NiMH); KR14 (NiCd); ZR14 (NiOOH)	14A (alkaline); 14D (carbon–zinc)	6135-00-985-7846 (United States) 6135-99-117-3212 (United Kingdom) 6135-15-052-5341 (Italy) 6135-66-048-7857 (Australia) 6135-99-733-1071 (United Kingdom) 6135-01-576-8491 (United States) 6135-14-353-5228 (France) 6135-19-004-1990 (Brazil) 6135-17-056-0142 (Netherlands) 6135-99-812-0878 (United Kingdom) 6135-99-199-4779 (United Kingdom)	8,000 (alkaline); 3,800 (carbon–zinc); 4,500–6,000 (NiMH)	1.5 1.2 (NiMH, NiCd)	26.2 × 50 (1.03 × 1.97)	Can be replaced with an AA cell or up to four AAA cells in parallel using a plastic sabot (size adaptor), with proportional loss of capacity.
	Sub-C SC	Type 332 (Soviet Union/ Russian Federation)	KR22C429 (NiCd); HR22C429 (NiMH)			1,200–2,400 (NiCd); 1,800–5,000 (NiMH)	1.2	22.2 × 42.9 (0.87 × 1.69)	A common size for cells inside cordless tool battery packs. This size is also used in radio-controlled scale vehicle battery packs and some Soviet multimeters. 1/2-, 2/3- , 4/5- and 5/4-sub-C sizes (differing in length) are also available. Soviet 332 type can be replaced with R10 (#4, 927, BF, U8) or 1.5 V elements from 3 V 2xLR10 packs.
	D	U2, HP2 or SP2 (UK); Flashlight battery MN1300; MX1300; Mono; Goliath; Type 373 (Soviet Union/Russia); BA-30 (US Military Spec WWII–1980s); UM 1 (JIS) 単1 #1 (China)	LR20 (alkaline); R20 (carbon–zinc); HR20 (NiMH); KR20 (Ni-Cd); ZR20 (NiOOH)	13A (alkaline); 13D (carbon–zinc)	6135-01-255-4786 (United States) 6135-15-051-6850 (Italy) 6135-14-301-9080 (France) 6135-00-835-7210 (United States) 6135-66-045-3419 (Australia) 6135-17-056-0140 (Netherlands) 6135-99-109-9428 (United Kingdom) 6135-15-219-3387 (Italy) 6135-01-446-8310 (United States) 6135-15-191-8540 (Italy) 6135-99-464-1938 (United Kingdom)	12,000 (alkaline); 8,000 (carbon–zinc); 2,200–11,000 (NiMH); 2,000–5,500 (NiCd)	1.5	34.2 × 61.5 (1.35 × 2.42)	Introduced 1898 as the first flashlight battery. Can be replaced with an AA cell or a C cell using a plastic sabot (size adaptor), with proportional loss of capacity.
	F		R25 (carbon‑zinc); LR25 (alkaline)	60	6135-00-164-8753 (United States)	10,500 (carbon‑zinc); 26,000 (alkaline)	1.5	33 × 91	Four F cells are often found within 6-volt rectangular lantern batteries.
	N	Lady; MN9100; UM 5 (JIS) 単5; E90	LR1 (alkaline); R1 (carbon‑zinc); HR1 (NiMH); KR1 (NiCd)	910A (alkaline); 910D (carbon‑zinc)	6135-99-661-4958 (United Kingdom) 6135-15-052-5342 (Italy) 6135-12-349-1146 (Germany) 6135-01-031-0862 (United States) 6135-14-439-9946 (France) 6135-66-089-8336 (Australia)	800–1,000 (alkaline); 400 (carbon‑zinc); 350–500 (NiMH)	1.5	12 × 30.2	Rechargeable nickel–cadmium and nickel–metal hydride are far less common than other rechargeable sizes. Mercury batteries of the same dimensions are no longer manufactured.
	A21	A21; 11A; E11A; MN11; L1016; 4LR23; V11GA; LR1016	4LR932 (alkaline)	1811A (alkaline)	6135-99-665-9374 (United Kingdom)	55 (alkaline)	6	10.3 × 16.0	Usually contains a stack of four LR932 button cells shrink wrapped together.
	A23	144; 23A; 23AE; 3LR50; 8F10R; 8LR23; 8LR932; A23S; CA20; EL12; E23A; GP12A; GP23; GP23A; K23A; L1028; LR23A; LRV08; MN21; MN23; MS21; P23GA; RVO8; VR22; V23GA	8LR932 (alkaline)	1811A (alkaline)	6140-22-200-0033 (Denmark) 6135-14-514-2482 (France) 6135-99-763-7271 (United Kingdom)	55 (alkaline)	12	10.3 × 28.5	Used in small RF devices such as key fob-style garage door openers, wireless doorbells, and keyless entry systems where only infrequent pulse current is used. Usually contains a stack of eight LR932 button cells shrink wrapped together.
	A27	GP27A; MN27; L828; 27A; V27A; A27BP; G27A	8LR732 (alkaline)			22 (alkaline)	12	8.0 × 28.2	Used in small RF devices such as car alarm remote controls. Can also be found in some cigarette lighters. May be made of eight LR632 cells.
	BA5800	BA5800/U (LiSOCl_{2}); BA5800A/U (LiSO_{2})			6135-25-145-8796 (Norway) 6135-01-440-7774 (United States) 6135-99-760-9742 (United Kingdom)	7,500 (LiSO_{2})	5.3 (LiSO_{2})	35.5 × 128.5	Has both terminals at the same end and is roughly the size of two stacked D cells. Used in military hand-held devices such as the PLGR.
	Duplex	Ever Ready No. 8	2R10		6135-26-050-3959 (Portugal) 6135-17-703-2958 (Netherlands) 6135-14-305-9243 (France)		3	21.8 × 74.6	Internally contains two 1.5 V cells hence the nickname 'Duplex'. Is sometimes erroneously marketed as a "B" cell battery due to the similar size. In Switzerland as of 2008, 2R10 batteries accounted for 0.003% of primary battery sales.
	4SR44	PX28A; A544; K28A; V34PX; 476A; L1325F; 28L	4LR44 (alkaline)		6135-01-444-2637 (United States) 6135-14-549-0239 (France) 6135-01-268-2151 (United States)	110–150 (alkaline); 170–200 (silver‑oxide)	6.2 (alkaline); 6.5 (silver‑oxide)	13 × 25.2	Used in film cameras, medical instruments, dog training devices. Often simply a stack of four SR44 (LR44) button cells shrink wrapped together.

== Rectangular batteries ==
Image	Names					Typical capacity (mAh)	Nominal voltage (V)	Terminal layout	Dimensions (mm)	Comments
Image	Most common	Other common	IEC	ANSI	NSN	Typical capacity (mAh)	Nominal voltage (V)	Terminal layout	Dimensions (mm)	Comments
	4.5-volt	1289 (in the UK); Pocketable battery 4.5 V MN1203; Type 3336 (Soviet Union/Russia)	3LR12 (alkaline); 3R12 (carbon‑zinc)	3LR12 (alkaline); 3R12 (carbon‑zinc)	6135-14-376-5079 (France) 6135-01-125-4867 (United States) 6135-13-119-1782 (Belgium) 6135-15-212-3288 (Italy) 6135-14-226-6412 (France) 6135-14-552-6802 (France) 6135-15-167-7801 (Italy) 6135-12-120-1247 (Germany) 6135-26-050-3958 (Portugal) 6135-33-155-0999 (Spain)	6,100 (alkaline); 1,200 (carbon‑zinc)	Alkaline carbon‑zinc (3 cells): 4.5	Two 6–7 mm wide metal strips +: shorter strip −: longer strip	H: 67; L: 62; W: 22	This battery, introduced in 1901, was very common in continental Europe until the 1970s. It usually contains three B cells in series. In Switzerland as of 2008, 4.5-volt batteries account for only 1% of primary battery sales.
	9-volt, PP3	Radio battery Smoke alarm battery Square battery Transistor battery 006P; MN1604; Type Krona (Soviet Union/Russia)	E block, 6LR61 (alkaline); 6LP3146 (alkaline); 6F22 (carbon‑zinc); 6KR61 (NiCd); 6HR61 (NiMH)	1604A (alkaline); 1604D (carbon‑zinc); 1604LC (lithium); 7.2H5 (NiMH); 11604 (NiCd); 1604M (mercury, obsolete)	6135-01-369-9792 (United States) 6135-99-634-8080 (United Kingdom) 6135-19-003-7917 (Brazil) 6135-12-186-9177 (Germany) 6135-99-813-3838 (United Kingdom) 6135-14-363-5842 (France) 6135-00-900-2139 (United States) 6135-21-898-8449 (Canada) 6135-13-118-4403 (Belgium) 6135-15-126-1831 (Italy) 6135-12-380-6813 (Germany) 6135-14-246-5048 (France) 6135-14-368-9793 (France) 6135-12-148-7026 (Germany) 6135-15-209-2996 (Italy) 6135-01-447-0949 (United States)	565 (alkaline); 400 (carbon‑zinc); 1,200 (lithium); 175–300 (NiMH); 120 (NiCd); 500 (lithium polymer rechargeable); 580 (mercury, obsolete)	Alkaline carbon‑zinc (6 cells): 9 Lithium (3 cells): 9 NiMH / NiCd (6, 7 or 8 cells): 7.2, 8.4 or 9.6	Both on same end +: male clasp −: female clasp	H: 48.5; L: 26.5; W: 17.5	Added to ANSI standard in 1959. Often contains six LR61 cells, which are similar to AAAA cells.
	6-volt Lantern (Spring)	Lantern; 6 V Spring top MN908; 996 or PJ996; Energizer 529	4LR25Y (alkaline); 4R25 (carbon‑zinc)	908A (alkaline); 908D (carbon‑zinc)	6135-66-131-8057 (Australia) 6135-01-202-8113 (United States) 6135-12-316-9235 (Germany) 6135-15-218-3786 (Italy) 6135-00-643-1310 (United States) 6135-14-226-6120 (France) 6135-33-103-2754 (Spain) 6135-26-050-3957 (Portugal) 6135-12-121-1326 (Germany) 6135-12-371-1930 (Germany) 6135-14-306-4747 (France) 6135-17-104-0545 (Netherlands) 6140-15-185-7182 (Italy) 6135-01-333-6737 (United States)	26,000 (alkaline); 10,500 (carbon‑zinc)	Alkaline carbon‑zinc (4 cells): 6	Springs, top +: corner spring −: center spring	H: 115; L: 68.2; W: 68.2 Rounded Corners The battery shall pass freely through a cylindrical tube 82.6mm Diameter	Spring terminals. Usually contains four F cells, 4 D cells, or 8 C cells.
	Lantern (Screw)	Lantern; 6 V Screw Top	4R25X (carbon‑zinc); 4LR25X (alkaline)	915 (carbon‑zinc); 915A (alkaline)	6135-99-645-6443 (United Kingdom) 6135-98-104-2560 (New Zealand)	10,500 (carbon‑zinc); 26,000 (alkaline)	6	Screw posts on top of battery. +: corner, −: center. Maximum diameter of the posts is 3.5 mm.	H: 109.5; L: 66.7; W: 66.7	Used in locations susceptible to high vibration/shock where connectors may be knocked off the terminals.
	Lantern (Big)	918; R25-2; Big Lantern; Double Lantern; MN918; Energizer 521	4R25-2 (carbon‑zinc); 4LR25-2 (alkaline)	918A	6135-01-568-8832 (United States) 6135-00-825-6692 (United States) 6135-66-024-4371 (Australia)	22,000 (carbon‑zinc); 52,000 (alkaline)	6	Screw posts on top of battery. Labelled only, no physical keying for polarity. Maximum diameter of the posts is 4.2 mm spaced 75 mm apart.	H: 125.4; L: 132.5; W: 73	Used in locations susceptible to high vibration/shock where connectors may be knocked off the terminals.
	J	7K67	4LR61 (alkaline)	1412A (alkaline)	6135-21-892-5239 (Canada) 6135-01-365-2707 (United States) 6135-12-364-9832 (Germany) 6135-01-275-1363 (United States)	625 (alkaline)	6	6.5 mm^{2} flat contacts, +: chamfered corner, −: top side	H: 48.5; L: 35.6; W: 9.18	Typically used in applications where the device in question must be flat, or where one should not be able to insert the battery in reverse polarity. Often contains four LR61 cells, which are similar AAAA cells.

== Camera batteries ==
As well as other types, digital and film cameras often use specialized primary batteries to produce a compact product. Flashlights and portable electronic devices may also use these types.

Image (AA cell for scale)	Names				Typical capacity (mAh)	Nominal voltage (V)	Shape	Terminal layout	Dimensions	Comments
Image (AA cell for scale)	Most common	Other common	IEC	ANSI	Typical capacity (mAh)	Nominal voltage (V)	Shape	Terminal layout	Dimensions	Comments
	CR123A	Camera battery 2/3A; 123; CR123; 17345; 16340; CR-123A; 6135-99-851-1379 (NSN)	CR17345 (lithium)	5018LC (lithium)	1,500 (lithium); 700 (Li–ion rechargeable)	3 (lithium); 3.6 (Li-ion)	Cylinder	+: Nub cylinder end −: Flat opposite end	H: 34.5 mm Ø: 17 mm	A lithium primary battery, not interchangeable with zinc types. A rechargeable lithium-ion version is available in the same size and is interchangeable in some uses. According to consumer packaging, replaces (BR)2/3A. In Switzerland as of 2008, these batteries accounted for 16% of lithium camera battery sales. Used in flashlights and UV water purifiers.
	CR2	15270 (Li-ion rechargeable, 800 mA); 15266 (Li-ion, 600 mA); 6135-99-606-3982 (NSN)	CR15H270	5046LC	750 (lithium); 600/800 (Li-ion types)	3 (lithium); 3.6 (Li-ion)	Cylinder	+: Nub cylinder end −: Flat opposite end	H: 27 mm Ø: 15.6 mm	Standard discharge current: 10 mA A common battery type in cameras and photographic equipment. In Switzerland as of 2008, these batteries accounted for 6% of lithium camera battery sales.
	2CR5	EL2CR5; DL245; RL2CR5; KL2CR5; 6135-99-577-2940 (NSN)	2CR5	5032LC	1,500	6	Double cylinder. Keyed.	Both on one end. Terminal center spacing 16 mm.	H: 45 mm L: 34 mm W: 17 mm	Commonly used in film and digital cameras. Shaped so that it can be inserted into a battery compartment only one way. Contains two CR123A cells.
	CR-P2	BR-P2; 223A; CR17-33; 5024LC	CR-P2	5024LC	1,500	6	Double cylinder. Keyed.	Both on one end. Terminal diameter: 8.7 mm Terminal center spacing: 16.8 mm.	H: 36 mm L: 35 mm W: 19.5 mm	Shaped so that it can be inserted into a battery compartment only one way. Typical mass: 37 g. They contain two 3 V cells exchangeable with CR123 cells.
	CR-V3	CRV3; RCR-V3 (Li-ion)		5047LC; 5047LF (primary)	3,000 (lithium); 1,300 (Li-ion)	3 (lithium); 3.6 (Li-ion)	Double cylinder flat pack. Keyed.	Both on one end	H: 52.20 mm L: 28.05 mm W: 14.15 mm	The same size as two R6 (AA) cells side by side. A rechargeable type is also made in this size. May be used in some devices not explicitly designed for CR-V3, especially digital cameras.
	CP1	DLCP1; DL-CP1C	CP3553		2,300	3	Prismatic.	Both on one end.	H: 57 mm L: 35 mm W: 7 mm	Shaped so that it can be inserted into a battery compartment only one way. No longer made by Duracell, nor listed in its official website, but still stocked as of 28 February 2017 by some re-sellers. Typical mass: 1.1 oz (31 g). Disposable equivalent of the Nikon EN-EL5 Li-ion rechargeable camera battery.
	7R31	Kodak K 7R31 538				4 (mercury) 4.5 (alkaline)	Cartridge	Negative along the side of the body; positive on the front, nose of the battery	Approx: H: 11 mm L: 40 mm W: 16 mm	Typically a cartridge of three mercury button cells for use in 110 format cameras. The later version of the battery used alkaline batteries.

== Button cells – coin, watch ==
=== Lithium cells ===
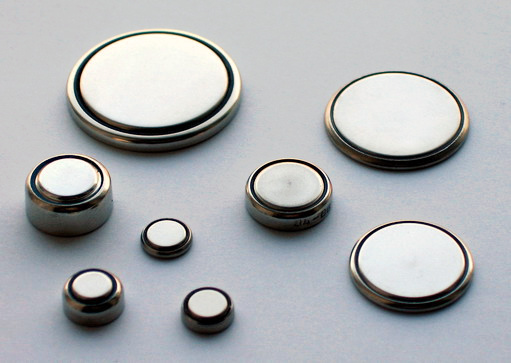
Coin cells of various diameters and thicknesses

Coin-shaped cells are thin compared to their diameter. Polarity is usually stamped on the metal casing.

The IEC prefix "CR" denotes lithium manganese dioxide chemistry. Since LiMnO_{2} cells produce 3 volts there are no widely available alternative chemistries for a lithium coin battery. The "BR" prefix indicates a round lithium/carbon monofluoride cell. See lithium battery for discussion of the different performance characteristics. One LiMnO_{2} cell can replace two alkaline or silver-oxide cells.

IEC designation numbers indicate the physical dimensions of the cylindrical cell. Cells less than one centimeter in height are assigned three- or four-digit numbers, where the last two digits are the height in tenths of millimeters, and the preceding digit(s) are the diameter in millimeters, rounded down (see table here). Taller cells are assigned five-digit numbers, where the first two digits are the diameter in millimeters, followed by the last three digits indicating the height in tenths of millimeters.

All these lithium cells are rated nominally 3 volts (on-load), with open-circuit voltage about 3.6 volts. Manufacturers may have their own part numbers for IEC standard size cells. The capacity listed is for a constant resistance discharge down to 2.0 volts per cell.

Names		Typical capacity (mAh)	Standard discharge current (mA)	Dimensions d × h (mm)	Comments
IEC	ANSI	Typical capacity (mAh)	Standard discharge current (mA)	Dimensions d × h (mm)	Comments
CR425		25	3	4 × 25	Pin-type battery used in illuminated fishing floats ("bobbers") for night fishing, and lighted archery arrow nocks. Other applications include TPMS sensors, electronic styluses, and real-time clock backup power. Weighs less than 1 gram, and has a very low self-discharge rate. Uncommon size, well-suited for installation into narrow tubular devices. It is unusual for having a 3.5 mm long, 1 mm diameter pin connected to the negative terminal. The case is typically not wrapped with a label, so it can function as the positive terminal. Typically installed by inserting the cell in the direction of its longest dimension, pin first. It can be used in place of BR425, BR435, and P139 batteries. Also available in a 3.7 V rechargeable Lithium-ion variant, LIR425, with LiCoO_{2} chemistry.
CR927		30		9.5 × 2.7	Used in wristwatches and a variety of LED art. Also used in some Lego toys.
CR1025	5033LC	30	0.1	10 × 2.5	
CR1130		70	0.1	11.5 × 3.0	A rare battery, sometimes used in car security (car alarm/keyfob batteries), organizer (backup battery for PDA such as Psion etc.), glucometer equipment and some pedometers. Also known as DL1130, BR1130, KL1130, L1130, ECR1130, KCR1130, E-CR1130, KECR1130
CR1216	5034LC	25	0.1	12.5 × 1.6	Used in some lighted watches and some LED decorator lights (electronic tea candles).
CR1220	5012LC	35–40	0.1 (CR); 0.03 (BR)	12.5 × 2.0	Used in keychain LED flashlights, and in some digital cameras to keep the time and date function running even when the main battery is taken out of the camera.
CR1225	5020LC	50	0.2	12.5 × 2.5	Maximum discharge current: 1 mA. Maximum pulse discharge current: 5 mA.
CR1612				16 × 1.2	Rare, used in Casio Film series watches.
CR1616		50–55	0.1	16 × 1.6	Used in automobile key remotes and in Game Boy cartridges (for powering the RAM for saved games).
CR1620	5009LC	75–78	0.1	16 × 2.0	Used in automobile key remotes and early digital watches.
CR1632		140 (CR); 120 (BR)	0.1 (CR); 0.03 (BR)	16 × 3.2	Used in automobile key remotes; e.g., Toyota Prius 2012.
CR2012		55	0.1	20 × 1.2	
CR2016	5000LC	90	0.1 (CR); 0.03 (BR)	20 × 1.6	Frequently used in digital watches. Often used in pairs instead of CR2032 for devices that require more than 3 V, like blue/white LED flashlights.
CR2020		115–125		20 × 2	
CR2025	5003LC	160–165	0.2	20 × 2.5	Frequently used in digital watches and automobile remotes.
CR2032	5004LC	225 (CR); 190 (BR)	0.2 (CR); 0.03 (BR)	20 × 3.2	Maximum discharge current: 3 mA. Maximum pulse discharge current: 15 mA. This is also the most common lithium cell. Commonly used on computer motherboards as nonvolatile BIOS memory and real-time clock (RTC) backup batteries, device remote controls, car FM transmitters, remote key fobs for cars and other vehicles. Also in other devices such as key finders like Apple's AirTag. Weighs around 2.9 g.
CR2040		280		20 × 4.0	Used in Skytronic PRO Audible Altimeter but also flow meters and organizers (as a memory backup battery). Has become obsolete and hard to find. Other names are BR2040, DL2040, ECR2040, E-CR2040, KCR2040, KECR2040, KL2040, L2040, L24.
CR2050		350		20 × 5.0	Available.
CR2320		110–175		23 × 2	
CR2325		165–210		23 × 2.5	
CR2330		265 (CR); 255 (BR)	0.2 (CR); 0.03 (BR)	23 × 3.0	
BR2335		165 (BR)		23 × 3.5	
CR2354		560	0.2	23 × 5.4	
CR2412		100	0.2	24.5 × 1.2	
CR2430	5011LC	270–290		24.5 × 3.0	Used in XBand Modem to save updates and profile data.
CR2450	5029LC	610–620		24.5 × 5.0	Portable devices requiring high current (3.0 mA) and long shelf life (up to 10 years)
CR2477		1,000	0.2	24.5 × 7.7	Has the highest capacity of lithium button cell batteries.
CR3032		500–560 (CR); 500 (BR)	0.1–0.2 (CR); 0.03 (BR)	30.0 × 3.2	Continuous discharge current taken from Panasonic Catalog. Applications include remote keyless entry, Card remote controls, memory backup, security price tags, smart transmitter tags and others.
CR11108		160		11.6 × 10.8	Also called CR1/3N because it is 1/3^{rd} the height of an alkaline N cell, and a stack of three of them will form a battery with the same dimensions as an N cell, but with 9 V terminal voltage. Such 9 V batteries in a single package do exist but are rare and only usually found in specialist applications; they can be referred to as 3CR1/3N. However, 2CR1/3N, a 6 V battery consisting internally of a stack of two CR1/3N and standardized by ANSI as 1406LC and by IEC as 2CR13252 (though some datasheets state it as 2CR11108 instead), is sold by Duracell (PX28L), Energizer (L544, now obsolete), and others. A CR1/3N is also used by photographers instead of two LR44 batteries in cameras.

=== Silver-oxide and alkaline cells ===
In the following table, sizes are shown for the silver-oxide IEC number; types and capacity are identified as "(L)" for alkaline, "(M)" for mercury (no longer manufactured), and "(S)" for silver-oxide. Some sizes may be interchangeably used in battery holders. For example, the 189/389 cell is 3.1 mm high and was designated 1131, while the 190/390 size is 3.0 mm high and was designated 1130, but a battery holder will accept either size.

Names				Typical capacity (mAh)	Dimensions dia × h (mm)	Comments (L), alkaline (S), silver-oxide
Most common	Other common	IEC	ANSI	Typical capacity (mAh)	Dimensions dia × h (mm)	Comments (L), alkaline (S), silver-oxide
SR41	AG3/SG3/G3-A; LR41; 192/384/392; 6135-99-949-0402 (NSN)(S); QR41	LR736 (L); SR736 (S)	1135SO (S); 1134SO (S)	25–32 (L); 38–45 (S)	7.9 × 3.6	
SR42	242; 344/350; 387S	SR1136 (KOH electrolyte, 344/350); SR1136S (NaOH electrolyte, 387S)	1139SO	63 (387S); 100 (344/350)	11.6 × 3.6	
SR43	AG12/SG12; LR43; L1142; 186/301/386; 6135-99-547-0573 (NSN)(S)	LR1142 (L); SR1142 (S)	1133SO (S); 1132SO (S)	80 (L); 120–125 (S)	11.6 × 4.2	
SR44	AG13/SG13; LR44/LR154; 6135-99-792-8475 (NSN)(alkaline); 6135-99-651-3240 (NSN)(S); A76/S76/EPX76; 157/303/357; 1128 MP, 208–904, A-76, A613, AG14, AG-14, CA18, CA19, CR44, D76A, G13A, G13-A, GDA76, GP76A, GPA7, GPA75, GPA76, GPS76A, KA, KA76, AG76, L1154, L1154C, L1154F, L1154G, L1154H, LR44G, LR44GD, LR44H, MS76H, PX76A, PX675A, RPX675, RW82, SB-F9, V13G, 357A	LR1154 (L); SR1154 (S)	1166A (L); 1107SO (S); 1131SOP (S)	110–150 (L); 170–200 (S)	11.6 × 5.4	Typical internal resistance: 8 ohms
SR45	AG9/SG9; LR45; 194/394/380; 6135-99-782-4675 (NSN)(S)	LR936 (L); SR936 (S)		48 (L); 55–82 (S)	9.5 × 3.6	
SR48	AG5/SG5; LR48; L750; 193/309/393	LR754 (L); SR754 (S)	1136SO (S); 1137SO (S)	52 (L); 70 (S)	7.9 × 5.4	
LR52	A640PX, E640, EN640A, EPX640A, MR52, PX640, PX640A	LR52 (L); MR52 (M)	1126A (L)	335 (L)	15.8 × 11.1	1.5 V (L), 1.35 V (M) No longer made by Duracell or Energizer, but still stocked by some re-sellers as of 26 February 2017
SR54	AG10/SG10/G10-A; LR54; 189/387/389/390; L1131/LR1130/SR1130; 6135-99-796-0471 (NSN)(S)	LR1131 (L); SR1131 (S)	1138SO (S)	44–68 (L); 80–86 (S)	11.6 × 3.1	
SR55	AG8/SG8; LR55; 191/381/391; LR1120/SR1120	LR1121 (L); SR1121 (S)	1160SO (S)	40–42 (L); 55–67 (S)	11.6 × 2.1	
	365, 366,S16, 608	SR1116SW	1177SO	28–40	11.6 × 1.65	1.55 V
SR56		SR1126			11.6 × 2.6	Listed in IEC 60086-2:2001, but apparently no longer manufactured by any major company.
SR57	AG7/SG7; LR57; 195; 395(low-drain)/399(high-drain); LR927/SR927; SR927W/SR927SW/GR927; 6135-99-796-0471 (NSN)(S)	LR926 (L); SR926 (S)	1165SO (S)	46 (L); 55–67 (S)	9.5 × 2.6	
SR58	AG11/SG11; LR58; 162/361/362	LR721 (L); SR721 (S)	1158SO (S)	18–25 (L); 33–36 (S)	7.9 × 2.1	
SR59	AG2/SG2; LR59; 196/396/397	LR726 (L); SR726 (S)	1163SO (S)	26 (L); 30 (S)	7.9 × 2.6	
SR60	AG1/SG1; LR60; 164/364	LR621 (L); SR621 (S)	1175SO (S)	13 (L); 20 (S)	6.8 × 2.1	
SR62	SR516SW; 317	LR516 (L); SR516 (S)		11 (S)	5.8 × 1.6	
SR63	AG0/SG0; LR63; 379	LR521 (L); SR521 (S)		10 (L); 18 (S)	5.8 × 2.1	
SR64	LR64; 319	LR527 (L); SR527 (S)		12 (L); 20 (S)	5.8 × 2.7	
SR65	SR616SW; 321	LR65; Varta V321			6.8 × 1.65	
SR66	AG4/SG4; LR66; 177/376/377; SR626SW	LR626 (L); SR626 (S)	1176SO (S)	12–18 (L); 26 (S)	6.8 × 2.6	Commonly used in many wrist watches.
SR67	315	SR716 (S)		21 (S)	7.9 × 1.65	
SR68	SR916SW; 373	LR916 (L); SR916 (S)		26 (S)	9.5 × 1.6	
SR69	AG6/SG6; LR69; 171/370/371; LR920/SR920/R90D; V371	LR921 (L); SR921 (S)		30 (L); 55 (S)	9.5 × 2.1	
SR416	SR416SW; 337	LR416 (L); SR416 (S)		8 (S)	4.8 × 1.6	
SR512	335	SR512SW		5.5 (S)	5.8 × 1.3	
SR712	SR712SW 346	SR712 (S)		9.5 (S)	7.9 × 1.2	Thickness is actually 1.25 mm (varies slightly to 1.29 mm depending on the manufacturer's specific tolerance)
SR714	SR714SW 341	SR714 (S)		15 (S)	7.9 × 1.4	Commonly used in high-precision, low-drain quartz wrist watches
SR731	SR731SW; 24; 329	LR731 (L); SR731 (S)		36 (S)	7.9 × 3.1	
LR932		LR932 (L)		40 (L)	9.3 × 3.2	Rarely used independently. 8 of these in series are used to form an A23 battery.
LR9	625; V625U			190 (L)	15.5 × 6.0	Key fob

=== Zinc air cells (hearing aid) ===
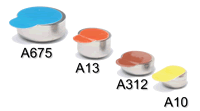
Zinc-air hearing aid batteries

Miniature zinc-air batteries are button cells that use oxygen in air as a reactant and have very high capacity for their size. Each cell needs around 1 cm^{3} of air per minute at a 10 mA discharge rate. These cells are commonly used in hearing aids. A sealing tab keeps air out of the cell in storage; a few weeks after breaking the seal the electrolyte will dry out and the battery becomes unusable, regardless of use. Nominal voltage on discharge is 1.2 V.

Names				Typical capacity (mAh)	Dimensions dia. × h. (mm)	Comments
Most common	Other common	IEC	ANSI	Typical capacity (mAh)	Dimensions dia. × h. (mm)	Comments
5	Red tab, AC5, ZA5	PR63	7012ZD	33	5.8 × 2.5	Marked as "discontinued" in Energizer data sheet as of 2011.
10	Yellow tab, AC10, AC10/230, DA10, DA230, ZA10	PR70	7005ZD	91	5.8 × 3.6	
13	Orange tab, ZA13	PR48	7000ZD	280	7.9 × 5.4	
312	Brown tab 6135-99-752-3528 (NSN); ZA312	PR41	7002ZD	160	7.9 × 3.6	
630	DA630		7007Z	1,000	15.6 × 6.2	No longer listed by Duracell
675	Blue tab, ZA675	PR44	7003ZD	600	11.6 × 5.4	
AC41E		PR43	7001Z	390	11.6 × 4.2	Discontinued

== Lithium-ion batteries (rechargeable) ==
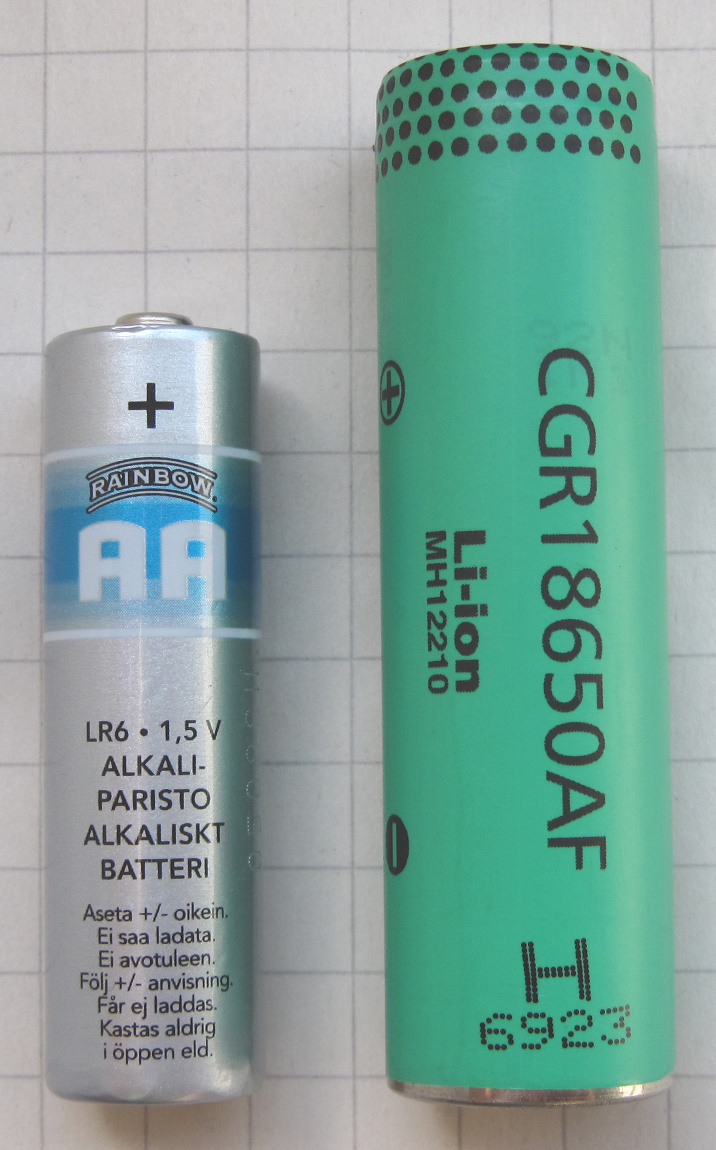
AA size battery and an 18650 lithium ion battery

=== Cylindrical lithium-ion rechargeable battery ===
Lithium-ion rechargeable batteries are generally not interchangeable with primary types using a different chemistry, due to their higher voltage. Many are also available with protection circuits that can increase their physical length; for example, an 18650 is around 65 mm (2.56 in) long, but may be around 68 mm (2.68 in) long with a protection circuit. Some such circuits increase cell diameter instead. The increased dimensions may mean the cell will no longer fit in battery compartments intended for cells without such circuitry.

Commonly-used designation numbers indicate the physical dimensions of the cylindrical cell, as given in IEC standard 60086-1 for cylindrical primary cells. The first two digits are the nominal diameter of the cell in millimetres, and the two following digits are generally the height in millimeters, with the fifth digit indicating cylindrical shape. Alternately, the last three digits can refer to the height in tenths of a millimeter. Manufacturers may use non-IEC designations for their products.

Names		Typical capacity (mAh)	Dimensions (mm)		Comments
ID	Other common	Typical capacity (mAh)	Diameter	Length	Comments
75400		80–150	7.5	40	Used in some electronic cigarettes.
08570		280	8.5	70	Used in some electronic cigarettes.
10180	Lithium ion 1/3 AAA	90	10	18	Sometimes called 1/3 AAA. Used in tiny flashlights.
10280	Lithium ion 2/3 AAA	200	10	28	Used in small flashlights.
10440	Lithium ion AAA	250–350	10	44	Same size as AAA cell.
10750		700	10	75	Designed for Lumintop GT Nano 2.0, GT Nano 3.0 and Frog 2.0 flashlights.
10850		700–750	10	85	Not widely available, used in some pen flashlights to replace two AAA cells in series.
13400		550	13	40	Commonly used in disposable electronic cigarettes.
14250	Lithium ion 1/2 AA	300	14	25	Same size as 1/2 AA cell. Used in the flashlight Lummi RAW.
14300	Lithium ion 3/5 AA	520, 540	14	30	Slightly longer than a 14250 due to an integrated Micro-USB receptacle and charging controller. Semi-proprietary, used in FOLOMOV C2 and EDC C2 mini flashlights.
14430		400–600	14	43	
14500	Lithium-ion AA	700–1,500	14	50	Similar size as AA cell. Those with a protection circuit are slightly longer. Used in many LED flashlights. Nominal voltage is 3.7 V. Variants include: Shorter Li-ion cell with a step-down converter to 1.5 V, e.g. Kentli 2,800 mAh.; Non-rechargeable LS14500 primary cell (SAFT: 2,600 mAh, 3.6 V)
14650		940–2,100	14	65	Approximately 5/4 the length of a AA cell.
15270	RCR2	450–600	15	27	Substitute for CR2 primary lithium. Nominal voltage usually is 3 V.
16340	RCR123A	550–800	16	34	Alternate substitute for CR123A primary lithium. Unprotected. (16 × 36, some protected versions).
16650		1,600–2,500	16	65	Made by Sanyo and a few others, narrower version of 18650 cells.
17500	A	830–1,200	17	50	The same size as an A cell, and 1.5 times the length of a CR123A. SAFT-brand cells (3600 mAh) are non-rechargeable.
17650		1,200–1,600	17	65	Between the size of a 16650 and 18650.
17670		1,250–1,600	17	67	Twice the length of a standard CR123A.
18350		700–1,600	18	35	
18490		800–1,400	18	49	Slightly shorter than a 18500 cell.
18500		1,100–2,600	18	50	About the same length as an A cell, but larger diameter. Occasionally sold and marketed as a "fat-A" size.
18650	168A, 1865	500–4,050	18	65	Widely regarded as the most produced lithium-ion cell size. This cell type is used in many laptop computer batteries, cordless power tools, many electric cars, electric scooters, most e-bikes, older portable powerbanks, electronic cigarettes, portable fans and LED flashlights. Nominal voltage is 3.6–3.7 V.
20700		2,800–4,250	20	70	Quickly superseded by 21700. Also used for larger electronic cigarettes.
21700	21–70, 2170	2,000–6,500	21	70	Announced by Samsung and LG Chem in 2015 for use in electric bikes. By January 2017, was being produced at Tesla Gigafactory 1 for the Tesla Model 3, reaching a production rate of 1.8 billion cells annually (20 GWh per year) by mid-2018. Also used for stationary storage (Tesla Powerwall 2 and Powerpack 2) and larger electronic cigarettes.
25500		2,500–5,500	25	50	
26350		1,800–2,000	26	35	less common Li-ion cell typically with capacities around 2000mAh and a nominal voltage of 3.7V, primarily used in specialized devices like flashlights, doorbells, and electric shavers.
26500	C	2,000-3,200	26	50	About the same dimension as a C cell.
26650		3,500–7,000	26	65	Popular size as ANR26650 LiFePO_{4} cell from A123 Systems for radio control hobby use. Also used in larger, high-powered LED flashlights and some electronic cigarettes. This size is sometimes used in devices that can take either one 26650 or three AAA cells in series in a cylindrical 3-cell battery carrier.
26700		4,000-5,000	26	70	LiFePO4 cells.
26800		5,500–6,800	26	80	A larger format for e-bikes and transport. Used in some flashlights. Higher capacity than traditional 26650 cells.
32600	D	3,000–6,100	32	60	About the same dimension as a D cell.
32650		5,000–7,500	32	65	Occasionally found in larger LED flashlights.
32700		7,000	32	70	LiFePO4 cells.
32140		10,000	32	140	The Hina NaCR32140-MP10 is a sodium ion based chemistry cylindrical cell. Batterydesign.net published a nominal capacity quoted from the manufacturer of "10 Ah" (10,000 mAh, 30.00 Wh @ 3.0V)
33140		15,000	33	140	High-power LiFePO4 cells, typically used in the portable power stations.
38120	38120S/HP	8,000-10,000	38	120	LiFePO4 3.2 V. LiFePO4 properties: long-lasting (2000+ cycles), safer, more stable, good continuous/peak discharge rates (3C/10C), less energy dense. These cylindrical cells are widely used in EVs, including electric bikes, electric scooters, electric cars / hybrid electric cars, UPS batteries, storage batteries for solar power systems, starter batteries for cars and motorbikes etc. The Headway 38120HP cells are used in high-discharge environments as they have very good continuous/peak discharge rates (10C/25C). Because four cells in series produces a voltage range similar to 6 cells of lead-acids and their fire-resistant properties, they can be used to replace a 12 V lead-acid car battery.
38140	38140S/HP	12,000	38	140	LiFePO4 3.2 V. Slightly taller version of the 38120 cells, most often used in electric bikes.
40146	40146L		40	146	LiFePO4 3.2 V.
40152	40152S	15,000	40	152	LiFePO4 3.2 V. Among the largest of cylindrical LiFePO4 cells. Height including the screw terminals: 167 mm
40174	40174L		40	174	LiFePO4 3.2 V. Among the largest of cylindrical LiFePO4 cells.
4680		23,000	46	80	Manufacturing also announced by Samsung SDI for future auto batteries.|Batterydesign.net published a tested capacity of "23.35 Ah" (23,350 mAh, 86.50 Wh @ 3.7V) at a discharge draw rate of 2.5A
4695		10,200 to 36,000	46	95	Occasionally found in larger LED flashlights, e-scooters and vehicles. Manufactured by Samsung SDI for future auto batteries.
46100			46	100	Manufactured by Samsung SDI for future auto batteries.
46120			46	120	Manufactured by Samsung SDI for future BMW cars.
66160			66	160	Discontinued

== Obsolete batteries ==
These types are associated with legacy applications, such as for vacuum tube equipment (A, B, and C batteries), or are no longer manufactured.

(V) = Nominal voltage

Names				Typical capacity (mAh)	(V)	Terminal layout	Dimensions (mm)	Comments
Most common	Other common	IEC	ANSI	Typical capacity (mAh)	(V)	Terminal layout	Dimensions (mm)	Comments
523	PX21	3LR50	1306A	580 (alkaline)	4.5 V		D: 17.1; H: 49.9	Used in cameras and Apple Macintosh computers (such as the 128K through 512K and similar). As the IEC name suggests, this is often just 3 LR50 batteries stacked together.
531	PX19	3LR50	1307AP	580 (alkaline)	4.5 V		D: 17.1; H: 58.3	A 523 with snap connectors attached to either end. Used in some older cameras, notably the Polaroid Automatic Land Camera packfilm models.
No. 6	Ignition Cell, 6135-99-114-3446 (NSN); FLAG (in UK)	R40	905	35,000–40,000 (carbon‑zinc)	1.5 V		D: 67; H: 172	Typical 20th century uses for this high capacity dry cell named for its 6-inch height include school science experiments, and starting glow plug model engines and in antique equipment. This dry cell is commonly used in the UK for remote level crossing telephone handsets, where solar cells and rechargeable batteries have not been specified or retrofitted. These were formerly used in primary cell powered alarms (those without mains power) and associated bell ringing, servant or nurse call systems, ignition systems, telephones, to improve voice quality on long lines to the local switch by increasing the off hook line voltage, impulse wound clocks (once a minute a mechanical movement pulses to advance electrically driven hands), and (in pairs) in WWII US Navy battle lanterns. Modern cells identified as alkaline may be one or more 'D' cells in a holder. The terminal posts are threaded 8–32 (Unified Thread Standard), insulated terminal nuts are normally provided, conical profile helical spring terminals are added for specific applications. Stamped and formed sheet metal spring terminals for bare wire connections (fahnestock clips) were supplied for use with telephones; e.g., the Western Electric 'Blue Bell' KS-6456 printed in blue ink on a grey paper and the Eveready 'Colombia Gray Label' printed in red ink on grey paper. +: centre; −: edge.
A Battery	Eveready 742				1.5 V	Metal tabs	H: 101.6; L: 63.5; W: 63.5	Used to provide power to the filament of a vacuum tube.
B Battery	Eveready 762-S				45 V	Threaded posts	H: 146; L: 104.8; W: 63.5	Used to supply plate voltage in vintage vacuum tube equipment. Origin of the term B+ for plate voltage power supplies. Multiple B batteries may be connected in series to provide voltages as high as 300 V DC. Some versions have a tap at 22.5 volts.
GB Battery	C Battery; Eveready 761				1.5 to 9 V	Threaded posts or banana sockets	H: 76.2; L: 101.6; W: 31.75	Originally used in vintage vacuum tube equipment for grid bias. Still popular for school science class use as a variable voltage supply as the current version has several taps at 1.5 volt intervals.
791	Eveready 791; Eveready 791-A Franco 1029 French 121 Bright Star 91-17	2R14			3 V		D: 25.40; H: 95.25	Equivalent to two C batteries (BA-42) in series. Used in the M1 Bazooka.
15-volt	Fuji W10; Mallory M154; NEDA 220; Rayovac 220	10F15 (Zn/MnO_{2})	220	65	15 V (10 cells)	Flat round (one each end)	H: 34.9; L: 15.1; W: 15.9	Used in older instruments and old battery–capacitor flashes. Used in Bang & Olufsen Beomaster 2400 remote controls. Still being manufactured as of 2020.
22.5-volt	Eveready 412	15F20 (Zn/MnO_{2})	215	140	22.5 V (15 cells)	Flat round (one each end)	H: 50; L: 25; W: 15	Used in older instruments. the Regency TR-1 (first transistor radio), and old battery–capacitor flashes. These are also sometimes known as B batteries, but are very distinct from actual B cell batteries.
30-volt	Eveready 413	20F20 (Zn/MnO_{2})	210	140	30 V (20 cells)	Flat round (one each end)	H: 64; L: 25; W: 15	Used in older instruments. These were sometimes sold as B batteries for hearing aids and small radios.
45-volt	Eveready 415	30F20 (Zn/MnO_{2})	213	140	45 V (30 cells)	Both on same end	H: 91; L: 26; W: 15	Used in older instruments. Sometimes were sold as B batteries.
67.5-volt	Eveready 416		217	140	67.5 V (45 cells)	Both on same end	H: 88; L: 33; W: 25	Used in older instruments. Many of these were sold as B batteries for early transistor radios, and were later superseded by the PP3 battery (9 volts).

=== PP series ===
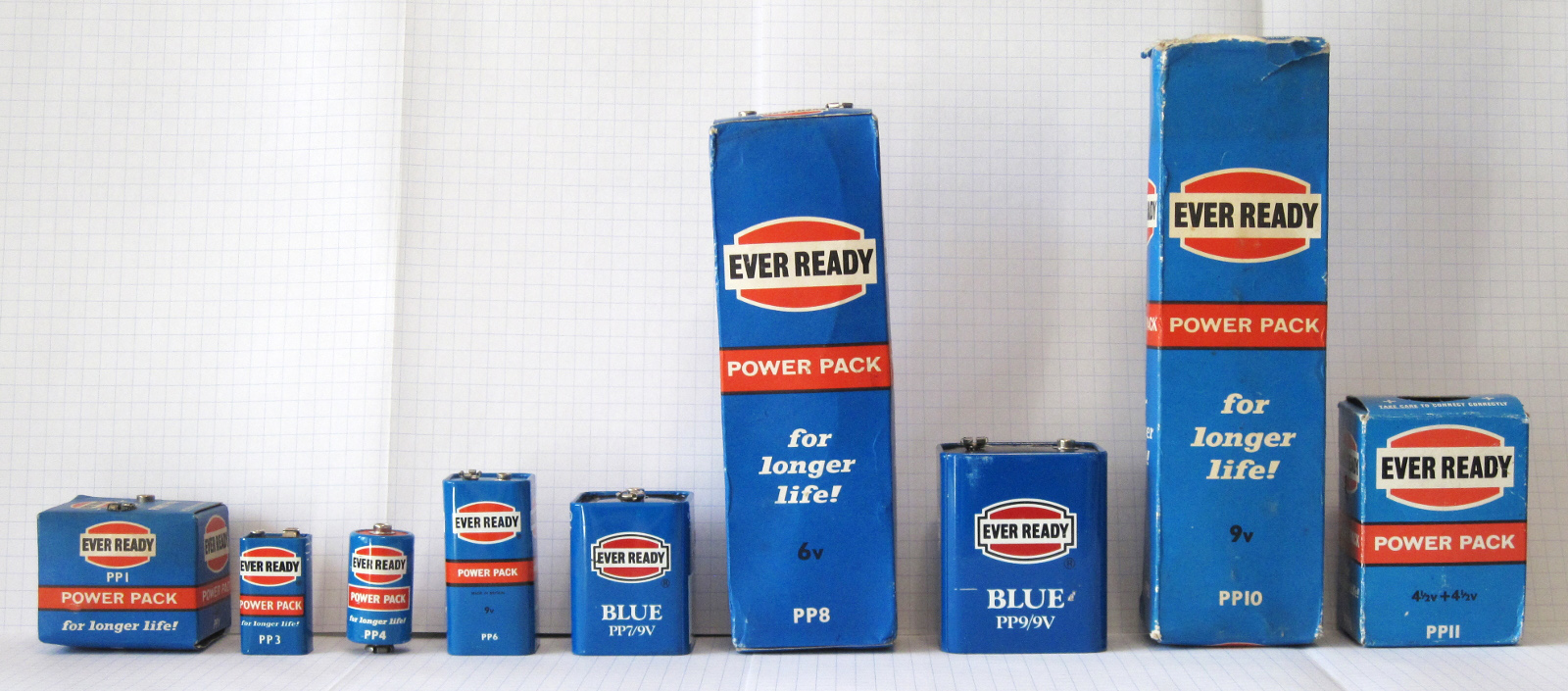
The PP battery range

The PP (Power Pack) series was manufactured by Ever Ready in the UK (Eveready in the US). The series comprised multi-cell carbon-zinc batteries used for portable electronic devices. Most sizes are uncommon today; however, the PP3 size (and to a lesser extent PP8, used in electric fencing, and PP9) is readily available. The PP4 was cylindrical; all the other types were rectangular. Most had snap terminals as seen on the common PP3 type. These came in two incompatible sizes, as is evident in some of the pictures below, those on larger, mostly older, battery types such as the PP9 being somewhat larger than those on the smaller batteries such as the PP3.

(V) = Nominal voltage

Image (with PP3/E battery for scale)	Names		Typical capacity (mAh)	(V)	Dimensions (mm)	Comments
Image (with PP3/E battery for scale)	PP	Other common	Typical capacity (mAh)	(V)	Dimensions (mm)	Comments
	PP1			6	H: 55.6; L: 65.5; W: 55.6	This battery had two snap connectors spaced 35 mm (1 3/8 in) apart.
	PP3	See PP3 battery				
	PP4	226; NEDA 1600; IEC 6F24		9	H: 50.0; Diameter: 25.5	
	PP6	246; NEDA 1602; 6135-99-628-2361 (NSN); IEC 6F50-2	850	9	H: 70.0; L: 36.0; W: 34.5	Center distance between terminals is max. 12.95 mm with both offset 7 mm nominal from the wider battery edge. Mass is 120 g.
	PP7	266; NEDA 1605; 6135-99-914-1778 (NSN); IEC 6F90	2,500	9	H: 63; L: 46; W: 46	Center distance between terminals is max. 19.2 mm. Mass is 200 g.
	PP8	SG8 "Fencer"		6	H: 200.8; L: 65.1; W: 51.6	This battery typically had two snap connectors; however, four connector versions are available. They were spaced 35 mm (1 3/8 in) apart. This type of battery is sometimes used in electric fencing applications.
	PP9	276; NEDA 1603; 6135-99-945-6814 (NSN) IEC 6F100	5,000	9	H: 81.0; L: 66.0; W: 52.0	This battery has two snap connectors spaced 35 mm (1 3/8 in) apart.
	PP10			9	H: 226.0; L: 66.0; W: 66.0	This battery had two-pin connectors. They were a single ⌀3.2 mm negative pin and a single ⌀4.0 mm positive pin spaced 13.0 mm apart.
	PP11			4.5 + 4.5	H: 91.3; L: 65.1; W: 52.4	This battery contained two independent 4.5 V batteries, and had a four-pin connector. 9 V with a center tap was available by wiring in series. There were two ⌀3.2 mm negative pins spaced 9.5 mm apart and two ⌀4.0 mm positive pins spaced 14.3 mm apart. Negative and positive pins were spaced 18.1 mm apart. It was used in some early transistor radio amplifiers with a Class B output stage, allowing the loud speaker to be connected between the amplifier output and the battery center tap.

== See also ==
- Battery holder
- Battery recycling
- Vacuum tube battery
- Comparison of commercial battery types
- List of battery types
- Search for the Super Battery, a 2017 PBS film
