= TI-1031 =

Calculator manufactured by Texas Instruments

- Type: 4 function
- Manufacturer: Texas Instruments
- Introduced: 1981
- Discontinued: 1981
- Predecessor: TI-1030
- Cost: $12.00

Calculator
- Display type: 7-segment display

CPU
- Processor: TI TP0311

Other
- Power supply: 2 LR43
- Weight: 54 grams
- Dimensions: 4.6" x 2.6" x 0.35"

The TI-1031 was a 4 function calculator manufactured by Texas Instruments. Introduced in 1981 at a price of $12 (equivalent to $42 in 2024), the calculator had a liquid-crystal display, weighed 1.9 ounces, and contained 24 keys.
