= N cell =

N cell may refer to:

- N battery
- $k$-cell (mathematics)
- The unit cube of dimension $n$
- N cell located in the small intestine.
