= Battery terminal =

Electrical contacts in a battery

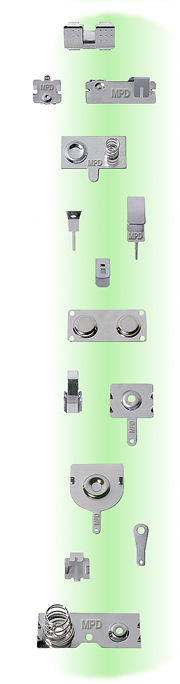
Common battery contacts and terminals for smaller batteries

Battery terminals are the electrical contacts used to connect a load or charger to a single cell or multiple-cell battery. These terminals have a wide variety of designs, sizes, and features that are often not well documented.

== Automotive battery terminals ==
Automotive batteries typically have one of three types of terminals.

In recent years, the most common design was the SAE Post, consisting of two lead posts in the shape of truncated cones, positioned on the top of the battery, with slightly different diameters to ensure correct electrical polarity.

The "JIS" type is similar to the SAE but smaller, once again positive is larger than negative but both are smaller than their SAE counterparts. Most older Japanese cars were fitted with JIS terminals.

General Motors, and other automobile manufacturers, have also begun using side-post battery terminals, which consist of two recessed female 3/8" threads (SAE 3/8-16) into which bolts or various battery terminal adapters are to be attached. These side posts are of the same size and do not prevent incorrect polarity connections.

L terminals consist of an L-shaped post with a bolt hole through the vertical side. These are used on some European cars, motorcycles, lawn and garden devices, snowmobiles, and other light-duty vehicles.

Some batteries sizes are available with terminals in many different configurations, but two main configurations are:

1. positive on left and negative on the right corner
2. negative on the left and positive on the right corner.

Terminals can also be both on the long or short side of the battery, or diagonally opposed, or in the middle. Purchasing the wrong configuration may prevent battery cables from reaching the battery terminals.

== Marine battery terminals ==
Marine batteries typically have two posts, a 3/8"-16 threaded post for the positive terminal, and a 5/16"-18 threaded post for the negative terminal.

== Zinc battery terminals ==
Zinc battery terminals are an environmentally friendly alternative to lead battery terminals. These types of battery terminals were designed as a result of environmental directives such as Proposition 65 and RoHS. Zinc battery terminals offer advantages over lead alloy-type battery terminals. These advantages include increased electrical conductivity, increased corrosion resistance, and reduced lead removal costs.

== SLA battery terminals ==
The most common sizes of sealed lead acid (SLA) batteries use Faston tabs, but some larger batteries use L terminals, while some very specialized designs use other, sometimes proprietary terminals, such as older Panasonic camcorder batteries (of the type used for VHS shoulder-mounted camcorders).

== UPS battery terminals ==
Batteries designed for use inside a portable uninterruptible power supply (UPS) typically use Faston tabs, often with an adapter cable between those and the UPS's internal battery connectors. Larger external battery packs use a variety of connectors, including the Anderson Powerpole MultiPole series (as used by Tripp Lite), which are color-coded and keyed for specific voltages. Very large batteries as installed in battery rooms such as are found in datacenters use bolted connections from cell terminals to bus bars or flexible cables.

== Dry battery terminals ==
Most cylindrical dry batteries (such as the AA battery) have a projection at one end (positive) and a flat base (negative). These mate with metal strips or springs in the battery holder.

Six-volt lantern batteries typically feature two coiled, cone-shaped spring terminals, designed to mate with flat contact plates on the inside of the battery compartment. Some lantern batteries instead feature screw terminals, while still others instead feature pin holes.

Nine-volt batteries have snap-on connectors.

Button cell (watch batteries) have terminals as both flat sides.
