= Vacuum tube battery =

Class of electrical battery

A generic triode vacuum tube circuit showing "A", "B" and "C" batteries

In the early days of electronics, devices that used vacuum tubes (called valves in British contexts), such as radios, were powered by batteries. Each battery had a different designation depending on which tube element it was associated with.

Initially, the only such device was a diode with only a filament (cathode) and a plate (anode). Following the direction of electron flow, these electrodes are identified as "A" and "B", respectively and thus the associated batteries are referred to as the "A" and "B" batteries respectively. Later, when the control grid element was added to create the triode tube, it was logically assigned the letter "C" and supplied from a "C" battery. Subsequent addition of further internal elements to improve the performance of the triode did not require an extension to this series of batteries – these elements are either resistively-biased from the existing batteries or connected to ground or to the cathode.

This nomenclature is used primarily within North America. Different battery names are used elsewhere in the English-speaking world.

== Categories ==
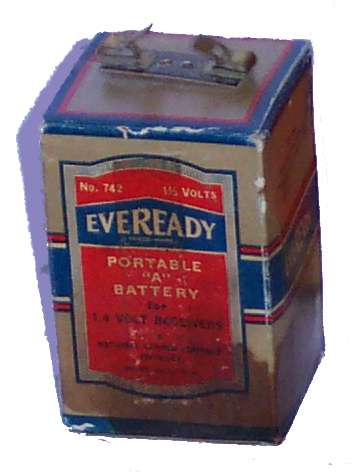
Eveready 742 "A" battery with 1.5-volt Fahnestock clip terminals

The "A" battery is used to provide power to the filament. It is sometimes colloquially referred to as a "wet battery". (A dry cell could be used for the purpose, but the ampere-hour capacity of dry cells was too low at the time to be of practical use in this service.) The term comes from the days of valve (tube) radios when it was common practice to use a dry battery for the plate (anode) voltage and a rechargeable lead-acid "wet" battery for the filament voltage. (The filaments in vacuum tubes consume much more current than the anodes, and so the "A" battery drains much more rapidly than the "B" battery; therefore, using a rechargeable "A" battery in this role reduces the need for battery replacement. In contrast, a non-rechargeable "B" battery needs to be replaced relatively infrequently.) "A" batteries were initially 2 volts, being lead-acid accumulators, but with the introduction of all-dry-battery radios, 1.4 volts became more common. Other voltages can be encountered. For example, 7.5-volt batteries are sometimes used to power a series-connected set of 1.4-volt valves (tubes). In Britain and some other countries, the "A" battery is known as the "LT" (low tension) battery if dry, and simply the "accumulator" if wet. Later, it became common practice to repurpose standard dry cells or multi-dry cell batteries as "A" batteries. A modified No. 6 cell was often used, later packs of multiple F-cells were used. In the early days of transistor radio, a single G-cell would often be used as the A battery.

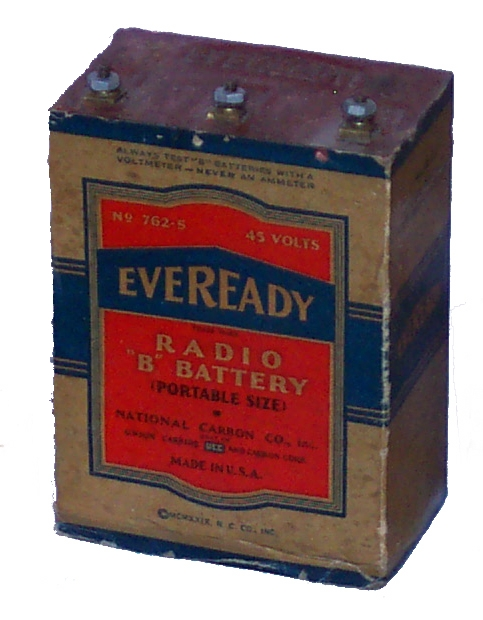
Eveready 762-S "B" battery with 45-volt & 22.5-volt tap screw terminals

The "B" battery is used to provide the plate voltage. It is sometimes colloquially referred to as a "dry battery" (although there is no reason why a "wet" battery of suitable voltage could not be utilized for the purpose). The filament is primarily a heat source and therefore the "A" battery supplies significant current and rapidly discharges. The "B" battery experiences comparatively little current draw and retains its stored capacity far longer than an "A" battery. Early "B" batteries used with bright emitter tubes were 120 volts, but these quickly became obsolete as they were replaced with examples having voltages of typically 45 volts, 67 1/2 volts, or 90 volts as more efficient tubes became available. Some examples have taps every 22 1/2 volts. The last B batteries sold were 22 1/2 volts and similar in size to a PP3 9-volt battery. Even when the plate voltage rail is fed by a power supply rather than a battery, it is generally referred to as the "B+" line in American schematics. Because plate voltages can be as high as 300 V DC, multiple "B" batteries may be connected together in series to additively provide the required operating voltages. The much higher available voltage of "B" batteries means that they must be handled more carefully than other battery types due to their ability to shock or burn the person handling them. In Britain and in some other countries, the "B" battery is known as the "HT" (high tension) battery.

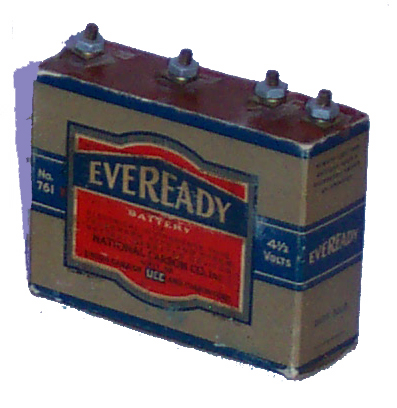
Eveready 761 "C" battery with 4.5-volt, 3-volt, 1.5-volt tap screw terminals

The "C" battery is used to provide bias to the control grid. Until the early 1930s this was common practice in valve (tube) radio sets but was largely superseded by grid leak resistors or voltage divider biasing. Because the tube grids draw no current, the "C" battery provides the bias voltage with no current draw. The battery's life in the radio is essentially its shelf life. In more recent times, they were popular in schools and colleges as a convenient variable voltage source in science classes. Eveready was still manufacturing them in the 1970s. The most popular battery is the 9-volt type with taps every 1 1/2 volts that accept banana plugs. A rare form of "C" battery is the bias cell, a button-size miniature battery designed to deliver a constant voltage with no current drain. These were briefly popular between 1936 and 1945 as the bias cell was less costly than a resistor/capacitor bias network. In Britain and in some other countries, the "C" battery is known as the "GB" (grid bias) battery.

== Obsolescence ==
Until the mid- to late-1920s all radios, except crystal sets, used batteries. They were cumbersome, needed frequent recharging, and leaked battery acid. Philco and other companies sold popular battery eliminators that plugged into light sockets. After RCA announced its AC tube in late 1927 the industry quickly designed batteryless radios using household power, obsoleting vacuum tube batteries and battery eliminators in the home.

== See also ==
- History of the battery
- List of battery sizes
- List of battery types
- Battery nomenclature
