= HT (vacuum tube) =

In vacuum tube technology, HT or high tension describes the main power supply to the circuit, which produces the current between anode and cathode. It is also known as the plate supply or voltage, B battery supply, or simply labeled →B on circuit diagrams, from the days of battery powered circuitry.

The HT supply circuit most commonly provides a positive voltage of some hundreds of volts to the anode (or plate) and in later circuits also to the screen grid, with the cathode running at near ground or chassis potential. The main exception to this was in the case of tubes with water-cooled anodes, once used for radio transmission, electric furnaces and similar applications. These tubes used a negative HT supply to the cathode, so that the anode could run near ground DC potential (but typically at many hundreds of volts of RF).

Other power supplies for vacuum tube circuits include:

- LT, low tension or A battery, the supply to the filaments or heaters. Early tubes designed for battery operation had 2 volt filaments (for use with a lead-acid cell). Later tubes had 1.4 volt filaments to run from dry batteries. With the introduction of mains powered equipment, indirectly heated tubes became more common and usually (though not always) required 4 volts in Europe and 6.3 volts in America. The latter became the standard voltage after the Second World War. One notable exception was that rectifier tubes often had 5 volt filaments or heaters which usually had to have a separate supply anyway.
- GB, grid bias or C battery. Used in early battery powered equipment. Once self biasing circuits were developed, this power source was no longer required.
- EHT, extra high tension, the accelerator supply to a cathode ray tube. This supply typically ranges from 15 kV to 35 kV, though very early television receivers used voltages as low as 4 kV.

== Typical circuits ==
=== HT ===
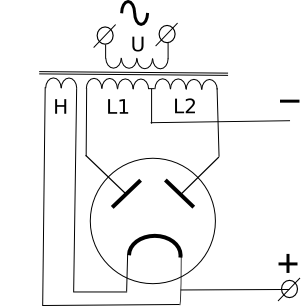
Typical HT supply circuit schematic

The HT supply was usually obtained from a full wave rectifier circuit similar to the one shown. In those sets that had no mains transformer (the so-called AC/DC design), the HT was obtained directly from the mains supply, either with a simple half wave rectifier or with a voltage doubler circuit.

=== EHT ===
In very early vacuum tube television sets, the EHT was derived directly from a high voltage winding on the mains transformer using a half wave rectifier. In later television sets, the EHT supply was invariably generated by rectifying the flyback pulses from the scanning circuitry rather than directly from the mains supply (a practice that survived the transition to transistor circuits). Although this provided a greater degree of safety, the reason for the change was that the mains transformer had been eliminated from sets produced from the 1940s onwards.
