= A27 =

A27 or A-27 may refer to:

== Roads ==
- A27 motorway (Belgium), a road connecting Battice and Sankt Vith at the border with Germany
- A27 road, England, between Wiltshire and East Sussex
- A27 motorway (France), a road connecting A22 and Baisieux
- A 27 motorway (Germany), a road connecting the A 7 at Autobahndreieck Walsrode and Bremen
- A27 road (Isle of Man), a road connecting Colby and Peel
- A27 motorway (Italy), a road connecting Venice and Belluno
- A27 motorway (Netherlands), a road connecting Breda and Almere
- A27 motorway (Portugal), a road connecting Viana do Castelo and Ponte de Lima
- A-27 motorway (Spain), a road connecting Tarragona and Lleida
- A 27 road (Sri Lanka), a road connecting Ampara and Mahaoya

== Media and entertainment ==
- Samsung Galaxy A27, an Android-based smartphone by Samsung Electronics

== Other uses ==
- A27 battery, a cylindrical battery of size 8 × 28 mm
- Aero A.27, a Czech bomber design of the 1920s
- North American A-27, U.S. designation for 10 BC-1 trainers ordered by Thailand for use as light attackers, but diverted to the Philippines
- Archambault A27, a French sailboat design
