= Battery holder =

Holder for a battery

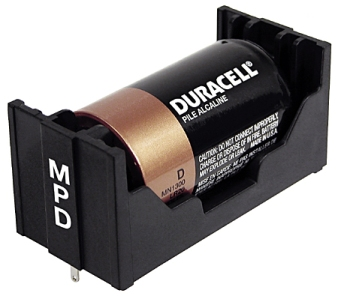
An alkaline battery in holder with pressure contacts

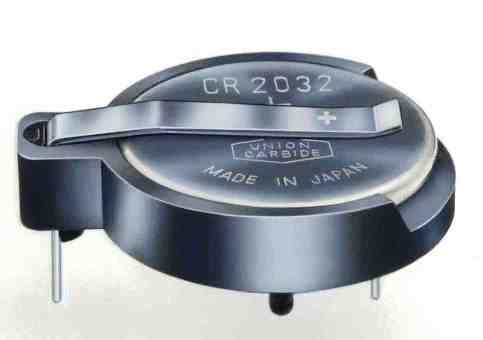
1987 lithium coin cell battery holder

A battery holder is one or more compartments or chambers for holding a battery. For dry cells, the holder must also make electrical contact with the battery terminals. For wet cells, cables are often connected to the battery terminals, as is found in automobiles or emergency lighting equipment.

A battery holder is either a plastic case with the shape of the housing moulded as a compartment or compartments that accepts a battery or batteries, or a separate plastic holder that is mounted with screws, eyelets, glue, double-sided tape, or other means. Battery holders may have a lid to retain and protect the batteries or may be sealed to prevent damage to circuitry and components from battery leakage. Coiled spring wire or flat tabs that press against the battery terminals are the two most common methods of making the electrical connection inside a holder. External connections on battery holders are usually made by contacts with pins, surface mount feet, solder lugs, or wire leads.

Where the battery is expected to last over the life of the product, no holder is necessary, and a tab welded to the battery terminals can be directly soldered to a printed circuit board.

== History ==
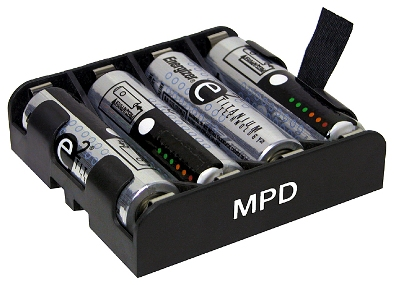
Battery holders with pressure contacts

In the late 1800s, patents were issued for consumer products like flashlights; US patent no. 617592 dated March 1898 is for an early metal flashlight that accepted D batteries.

Some early 1900s battery holders were often no more than a cardboard box with copper contacts. By the 1920s, battery holders used twin metal clips (like fuse holders) to hold the battery in place while making electrical contact. Patent no. 1439429 was granted in Dec. 1922 for an assembly with two spring arm clips, a small switch, and a lamp assembly on the end of connected wires.

The introduction of polypropylene in the 1950s and miniature batteries by Eveready allowed for the use of small plastic battery holders. These are still common in toys, decorations, and lighted or blinking items. In 1957, electric wrist watches gained popularity with the public.

Battery holders developed in parallel with batteries over time; as battery-package sizes shrank so did the holders. In the 1980s, the first circuit board mounting lithium coin or button cell battery holders appeared in the form of patent no. 4487820 by the battery holder manufacturer MPD.

The electronics industry now uses many surface-mounted lithium battery holders or sockets. CR2/3A, CR1/2AA, and CR123A batteries began in camera applications but expanded into new markets like alarm systems, hand held computers and keyfobs.

== Design considerations ==
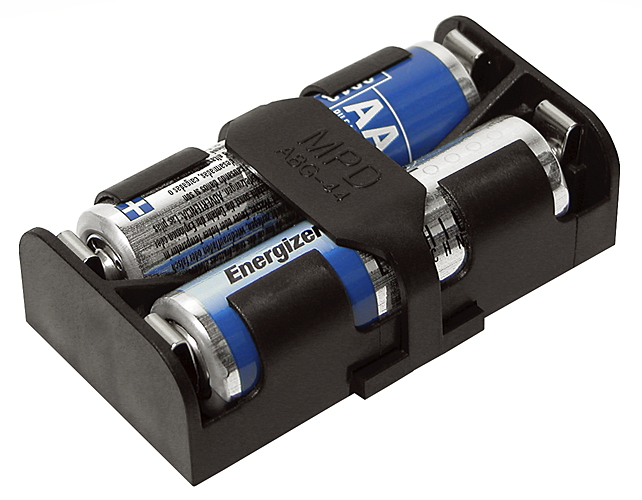
Energizer batteries in twin cell holder with battery hold down strap

Design of the battery holder requires knowledge of how and where the larger product will be used. Human factors to be considered include ease of battery exchange, age range and physical condition of the intended user. These elements must be taken into account for a design to be successful and are part of the design process. A designer must select between a battery holder molded into the product case or made as a separate part. For many products regulations and product safety standards affect the battery holder selection.

Most current battery holders are made with polypropylene or nylon bodies rated for 80–100 °C (176–212 °F). Lithium coin cell holders are made with high temperature PBT, nylon or LCP bodies because they normally are circuit board mounted and require wave soldering at 180–240 °C (356–464 °F) or reflow soldering at 230–300 °C (446–572 °F).

Battery contacts are the most important part of the design and require serious consideration. Since batteries are nickel-plated, it is recommended the contacts be nickel-plated to prevent galvanic corrosion between dissimilar metals. Battery contacts may be fixed contacts, flexible contacts, or some combination of the two.

Fixed contacts are inexpensive but prone to loss of electrical connection. Combination of fixed and flexible contacts are a better solution, but this is subject to an open circuit upon movement in the direction away from the fixed position; the spring contact compresses and allows the battery to move away from the fixed contact. A flexible contact allows for slight expansion of the cell on discharge, as internal chemicals increase in volume. Flexible contacts with multiple fingers touching the anode and cathode allow for movement in multiple directions without losing electrical connection.

Polarity, or reverse battery, protection can be part of the design. The contact for the anode side can be recessed behind plastic and receive a battery nub common on alkaline batteries. Another method is a plastic channel to receive a battery post or terminal. In July 2010, Microsoft said it hoped to sell its InstaLoad polarity protection technology, which allows batteries to be inserted in either orientation and still operate properly. Prior methods to accomplish this were expensive or caused a passive energy drain on the battery, whereas this solution is purely mechanical and affordable to produce.

Battery types such as the 9-volt have snap-on contacts.

Battery holders for zinc-air batteries must not be completely air-tight since approximately 1 litre of air is required per ampere-hour of discharge per cell. The battery holder may include a valve integrated with the device power switch to allow air to be admitted when the device is switched on.

== See also ==
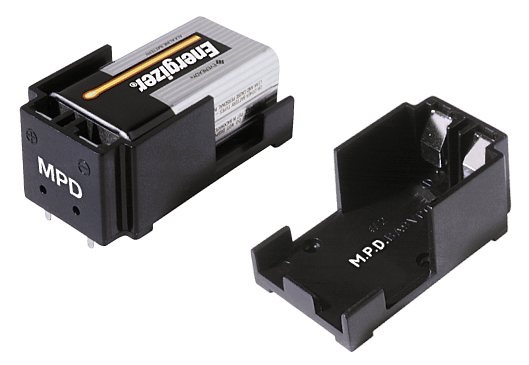
9 volt battery holder with pressure contacts has unequal width in the contact slots for reverse polarity protection

- Battery nomenclature
- Battery terminals, an alternative method of connecting batteries
- Alkaline battery
- JST connector
- List of battery sizes
