= InstaLoad =

Logo

InstaLoad is a patented technology developed by Microsoft which allows cylindrical batteries to function in a battery holder regardless of the batteries' polarity.

== Design ==
The device is designed to save time when swapping out batteries and reduce confusion from hard to read battery diagrams.

Initially battery cell sizes CR123, AA, AAA, C and D were to be catered for.

InstaLoad was designed to address the large number of phone calls to the Microsoft customer help desk in which consumers were improperly placing batteries in Microsoft wireless devices (such as the keyboard and mouse). In 2012 Memory Protection Devices began manufacturing and selling battery carriers that use InstaLoad. Their products are used by EMTS on ambulances and by patients who use life saving devices that are unable to physically change the batteries on their device.

== Licensing ==
The InstaLoad technology can be licensed from the Microsoft hardware Intellectual Property Licensing program. Microsoft provides royalty-free licensing for manufacturers of accessibility devices. InstaLoad is purely mechanical.

== Reception ==
There were concerns that while "cheap gadgets" could benefit from the technology the licensing terms might prove an obstacle to uptake.
