= TI-1030 =

Calculator manufactured by Texas Instruments

- Type: 4 function
- Introduced: June 11, 1978
- Discontinued: 1980
- Successor: TI-1031
- Cost: $15.95

Calculator
- Display type: LCD

Other
- Power supply: 2 LR43
- Weight: 54 grams
- Dimensions: 4.6" x 2.6" x 0.35"

The TI-1030 is a 4 function calculator first manufactured by Texas Instruments on June 11, 1978. The introductory price was $15.95 (equivalent to $77 in 2024). It was powered by 2 LR43 sized batteries.
