= Expansion spring =

Electrical connectors

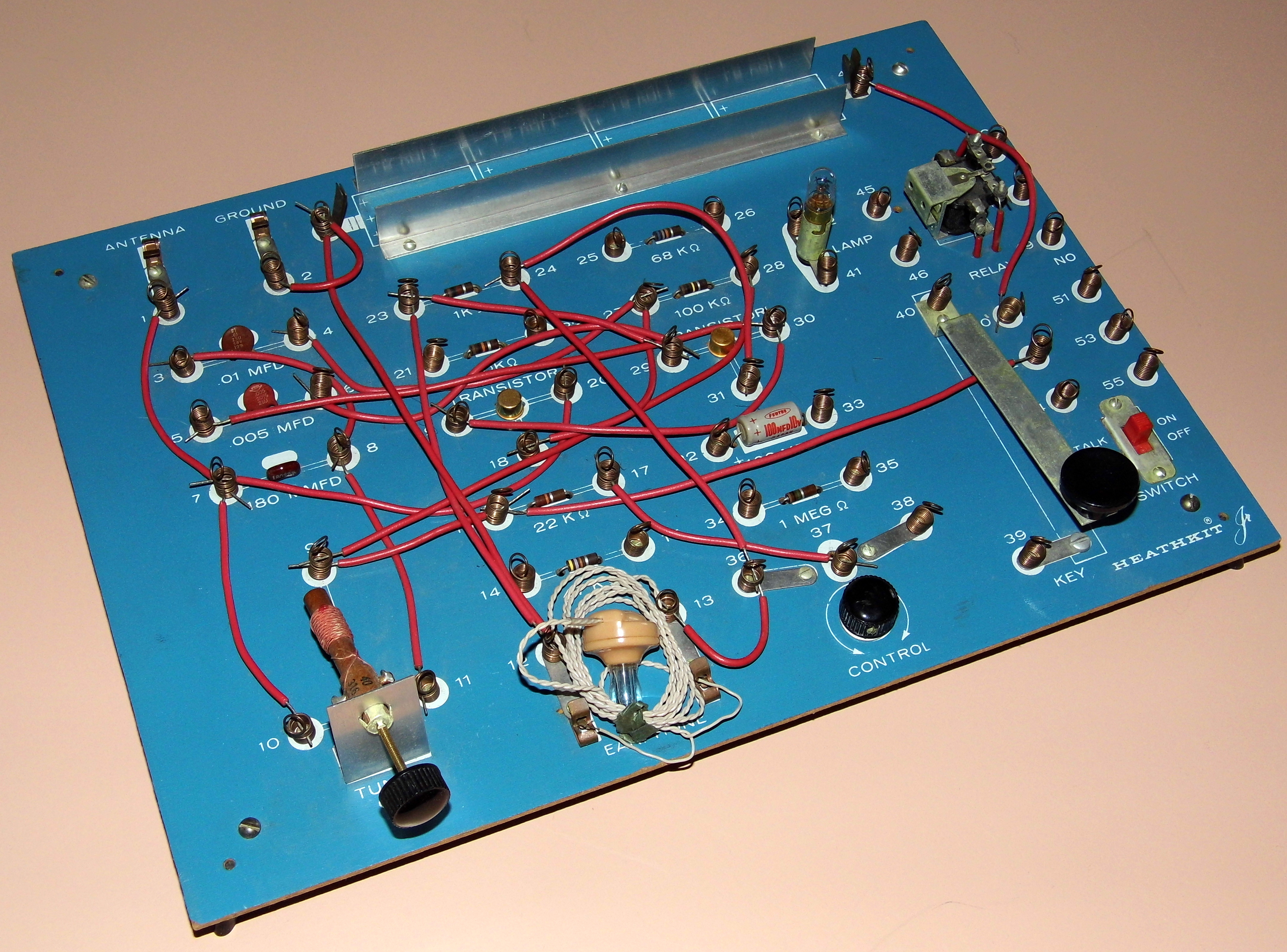
A 1960-vintage educational electronics kit using expansion spring connnections between mounted components and red interconnecting wires.

Expansion springs are used as electrical connectors in some children's electronics kits. They are easy to use with bare fingers, they accept multiple wires, they require no learning or expertise to use them, and the cost is low.

Kits employing these connectors also have the secondary advantage that many additional projects can be made if the components are removed from the springs, and components strung between the springs instead of wires. For even more projects, these kits usually have enough space to add further springs.

Their major limitation is that spring connectors can not accept integrated circuit chips.

== See also ==
- Fahnestock clip
