= N battery =

Standard size of dry cell battery

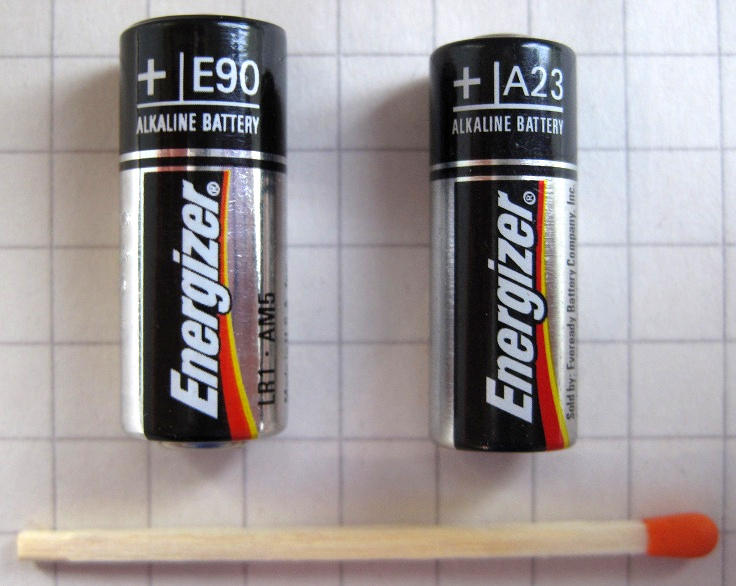
A side-by-side comparison between N (E90) and A23 batteries, showing the similarity in size

An N battery (or N cell) is a standard size of dry-cell battery. An N battery is cylindrical with electrical contacts on each end; the positive end has a bump on the top. The battery has a length of 30.2 mm (1.19 in) and a diameter of 12.0 mm (0.47 in), and is approximately three-fifths the length of a AA battery.

== Overview ==
The N-cell battery was designed by Burgess Battery Company and was part of a series of smaller batteries including the Z battery (AA) and the Number 7 battery (AAA).

A zinc–carbon battery in this type is designated as R1 by IEC standards; likewise, an alkaline battery in this type is designated as LR1. ANSI designates this battery as 910A and 910D for alkaline and zinc–carbon chemistries, respectively. Energizer calls this type E90.

Mercury batteries of the same dimensions are no longer manufactured because of their toxicity. Former mercury cells, such as the Mallory RM401, Duracell RM-401, IEC-MR1, etc., were supplanted by the alkaline Kodak KN.

Rechargeable N-size batteries are also available, in nickel–cadmium (KR1) and nickel–metal hydride (HR1) chemistries. However, these are far less common than other rechargeable sizes. Rechargeable N-Series batteries may be charged in an AA charger using a makeshift adapter (such as a small metal slug or a spring). Some universal battery chargers (with spring-loaded contacts) are also able to charge N size batteries.

Common uses for this size of battery include some small flashlights, radio pocket pager receivers, remote control door chimes, glucose meters, small desk clocks, wireless microphones, laser pointers, some vintage calculators, some slot cars, film cameras, and small vibrators. However, as technology has improved, many of these devices now run on button batteries.

An N-cell battery has a similar size to the A23 battery, which has a 12 V output.

	Zinc–carbon	Alkaline	NiCd	NiMH
IEC name	R1	LR1	KR1	HR1
ANSI/NEDA name	910D	910A		
Typical capacity	400 mAh	800–1,000 mAh	150 mAh	350–500 mAh
Nominal voltage	1.50 V	1.50 V	1.25 V	1.25 V

== See also ==
- Battery recycling
