= A23 battery =

Battery format

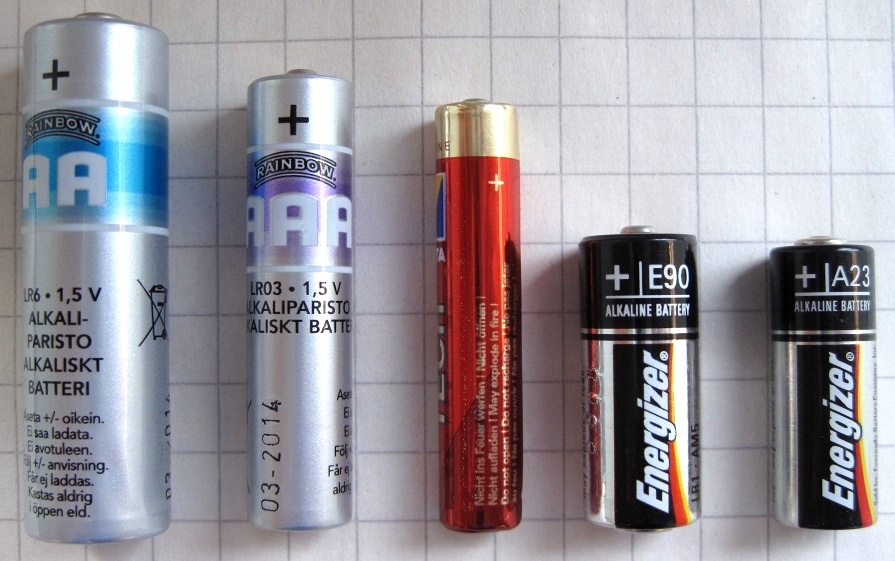
Left to right: AA, AAA, AAAA, N (E90) and A23 batteries

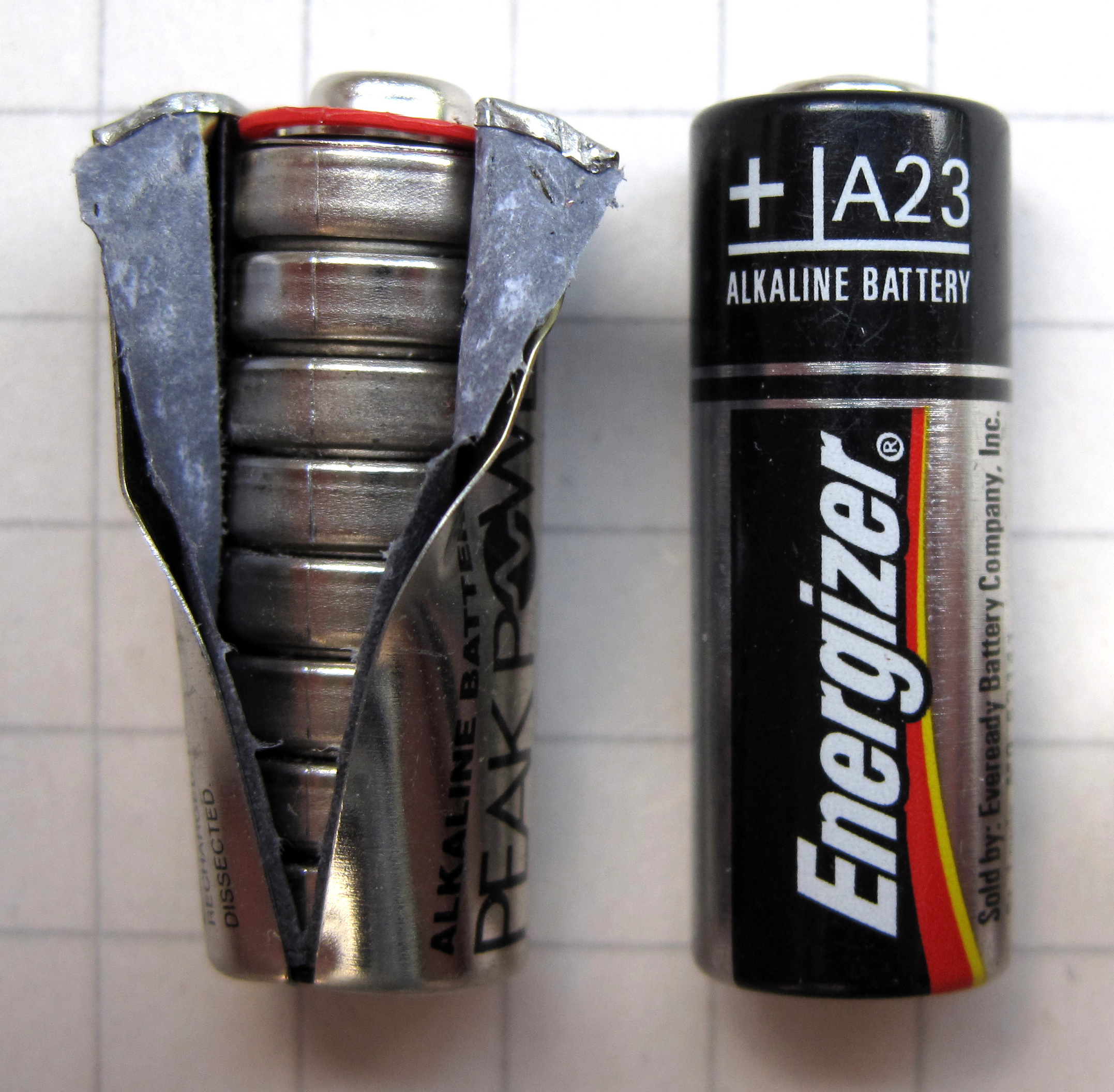
An open A23 battery showing the LR932 cells with an intact battery

The A23 battery (also referred to as 23AE, GP23A, V23GA, LRV08, 8LR932, 8LR23, MN21, L1028 or ANSI-1181A) is a dry battery consisting of eight LR932 cells, with a nominal voltage of 12 V.

It is mainly used in small electronic keychain radio devices, such as keyless vehicle entry systems, home security systems, garage door openers, and Bluetooth headsets.

== Design ==
An A23 battery is cylindrical and approximately two-thirds the length of an AAA battery, measuring 28.2 mm (1.11 in) long and 10.0 mm (0.39 in) in diameter, with a typical weight of 8 grams. An A23 battery is an 8-cell device with a nominal voltage of 12 V. The higher voltage is necessary for the radio frequency-transmitting and receiving devices which A23 batteries often power. It has a capacity of around 55 mAh.

A23 batteries are constructed of eight individual LR932 alkaline button cells enclosed in a wrapper.

The A23 battery is close in size to the N battery, which has a voltage of 1.25 V to 1.5 V. It is also similar to the A27 battery, which has the same 12 V nominal voltage and almost the same length but is smaller in diameter by about 20%.

== See also ==
- List of battery sizes
