= A27 battery =

Battery format

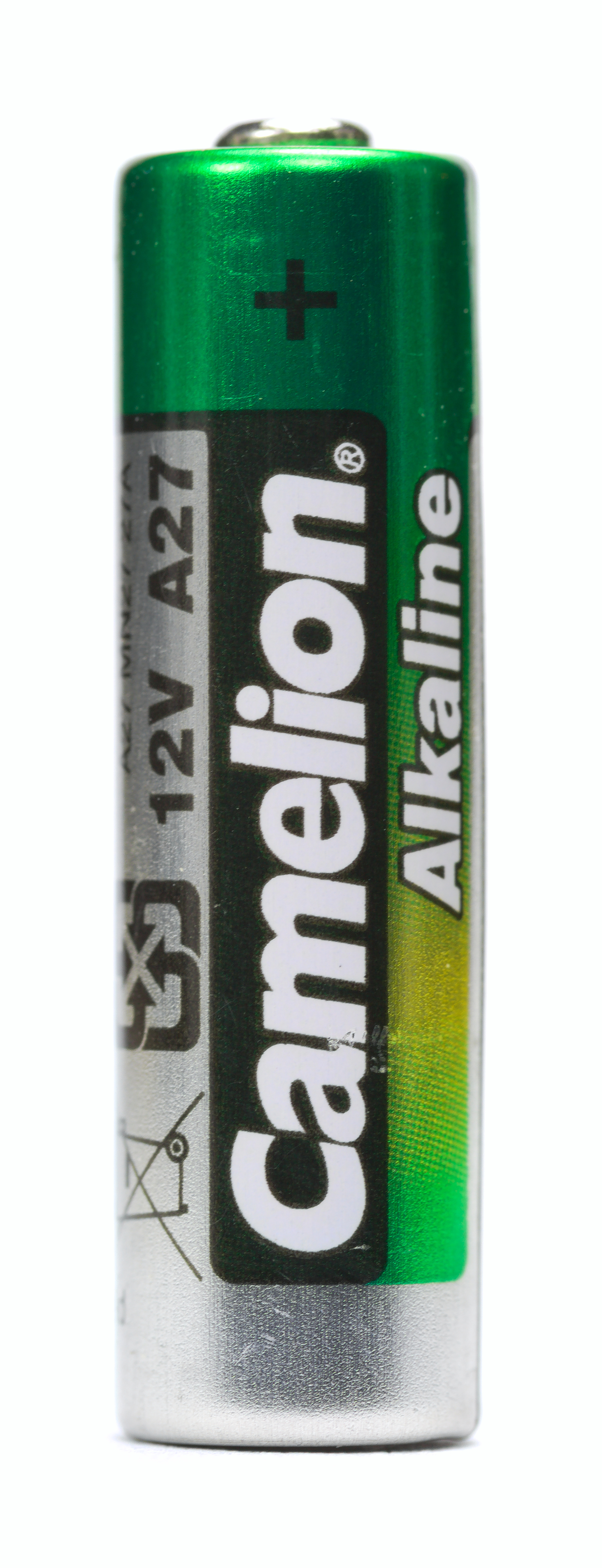
A single A27 battery

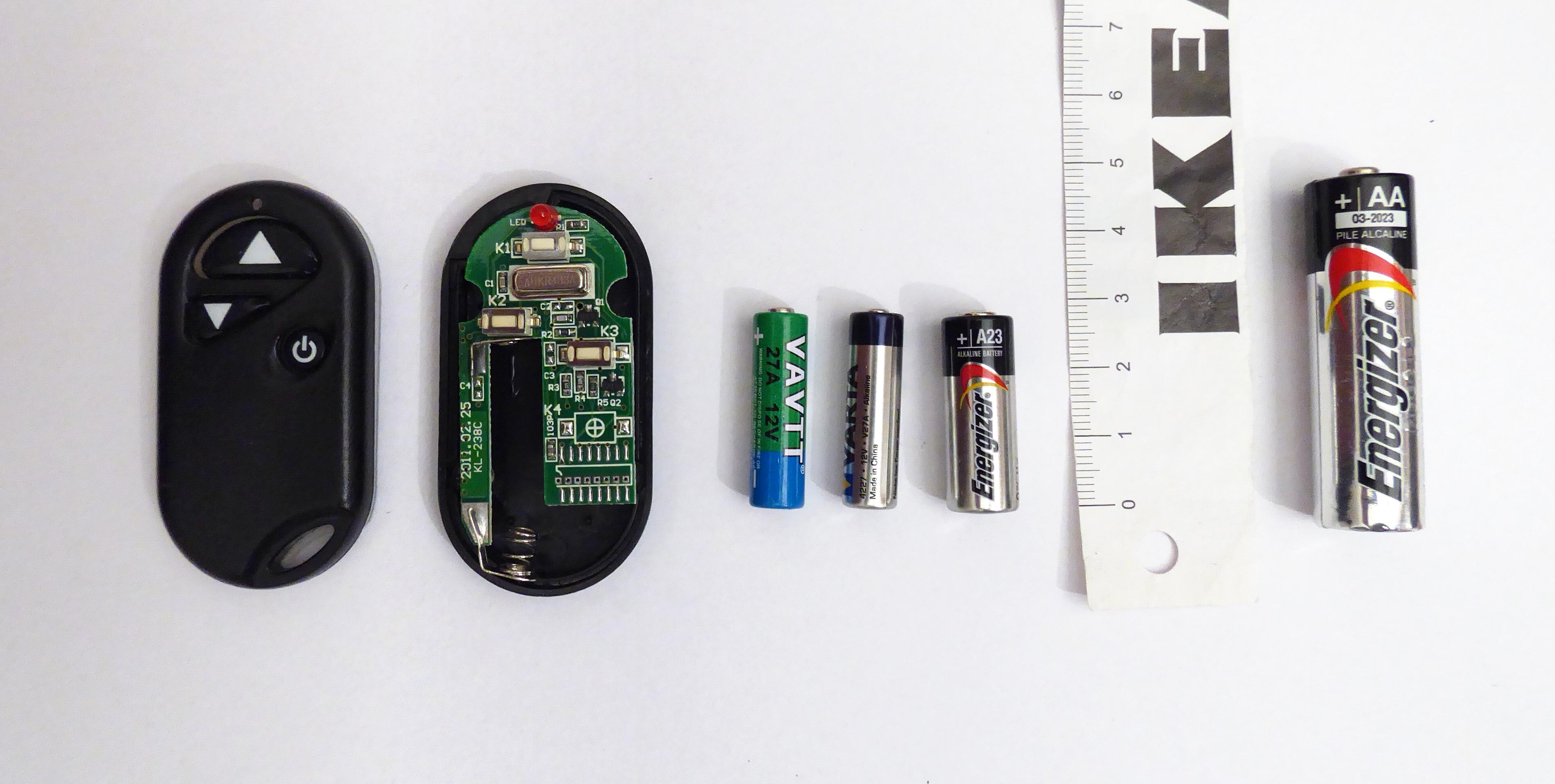
Two A27 batteries, with an A23 and an AA battery for comparison, and a remote control using this type of battery

The A27 battery (also known as GP27A, MN27, L828, 27A, V27A, A27BP, G27A) is a dry cell-type battery used in some small remote controls and some cigarette lighters.

== Description ==
An A27 battery is cylindrical, 27.8 mm (1.09 in) long and 7.7 mm (0.30 in) in diameter, with a typical weight of 4.4 grams, and a typical capacity around 20 mAh. It has a nominal voltage of 12 V. It is similar to the A23 battery, with almost the same length and the same nominal voltage, but thinner and made of eight LR732 button cells.

== See also ==
- List of battery sizes
- Battery (electricity)
