= Fahnestock clip =

Early type of electrical connector

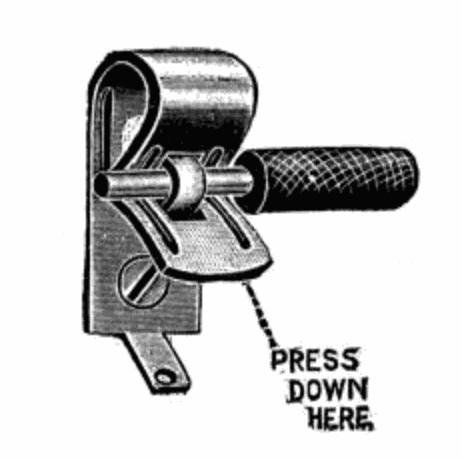
A Fahnestock clip, showing how it grips a stripped wire. It can be released by pushing the tab down as shown.

A Fahnestock clip is an early type of spring clamp electrical terminal for connections to bare wires. It is still used in educational electronic kits and teaching laboratories in schools. It is designed to grip a bare wire securely, yet release it with the push of a tab. The clip was patented in the United States on February 26, 1907 (119 years ago) by John Schade Jr., assigned to Fahnestock Electric Co. Less than two weeks after the patent was issued they filed for reissue.

== Design ==
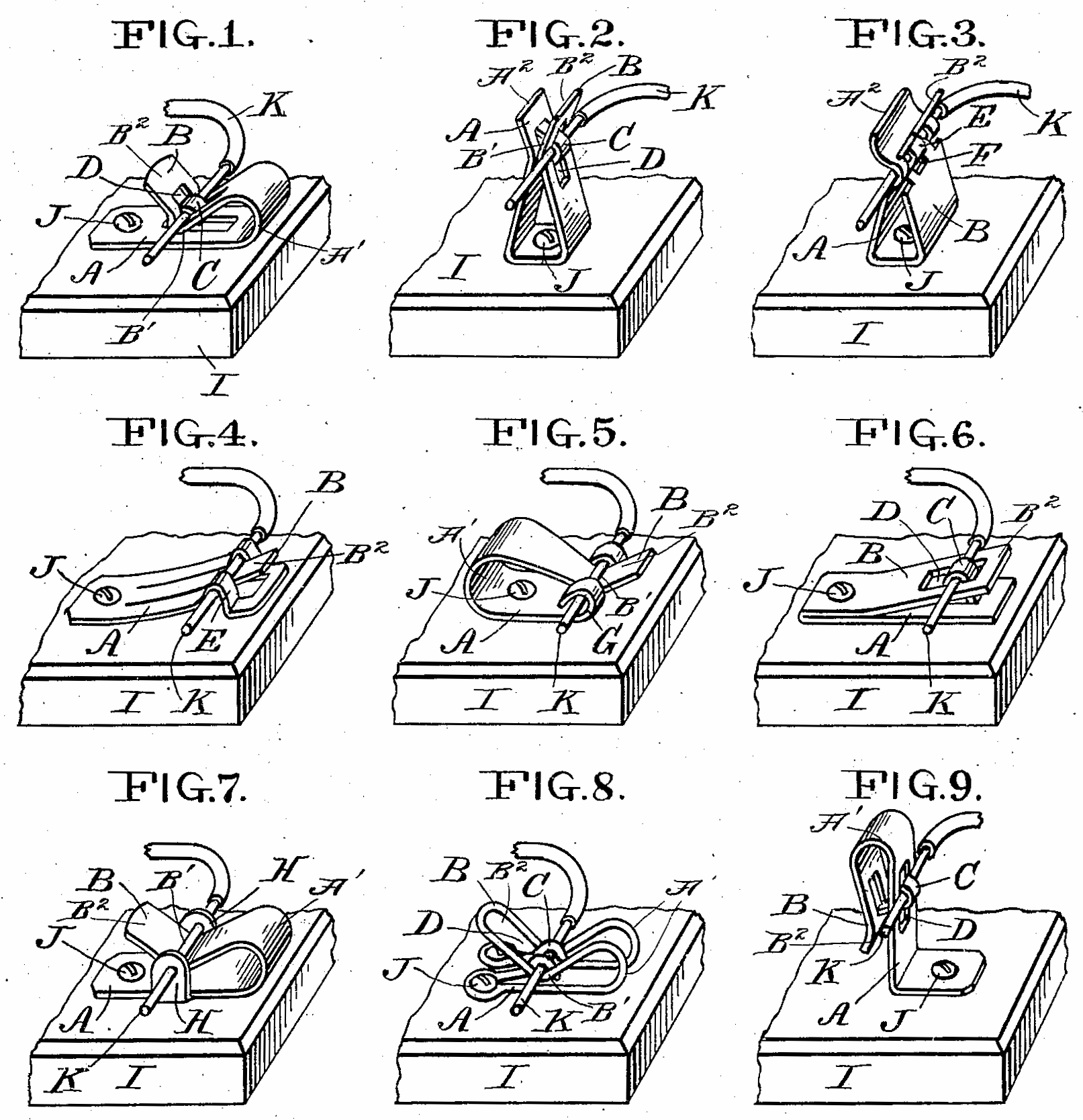
Various Fahnestock clip designs

A Fahnestock clip consists of a single flat piece of springy metal, bent over itself to form a clip. Pushing down on the end of the metal tab reveals a tang with an open hole through which a bare or stripped wire can be inserted. Releasing pressure allows the tab to spring back, closing the hole and gripping the wire to form an electrically sound mechanical connection. Pushing the tab again releases the grip on the wire so it can be withdrawn.

Fahnestock clips were commonly made of phosphor bronze or spring steel and plated with tin or copper for good electrical conductivity and corrosion-resistance. Most Fahnestock clips seen today are nickel-plated.

== Use ==
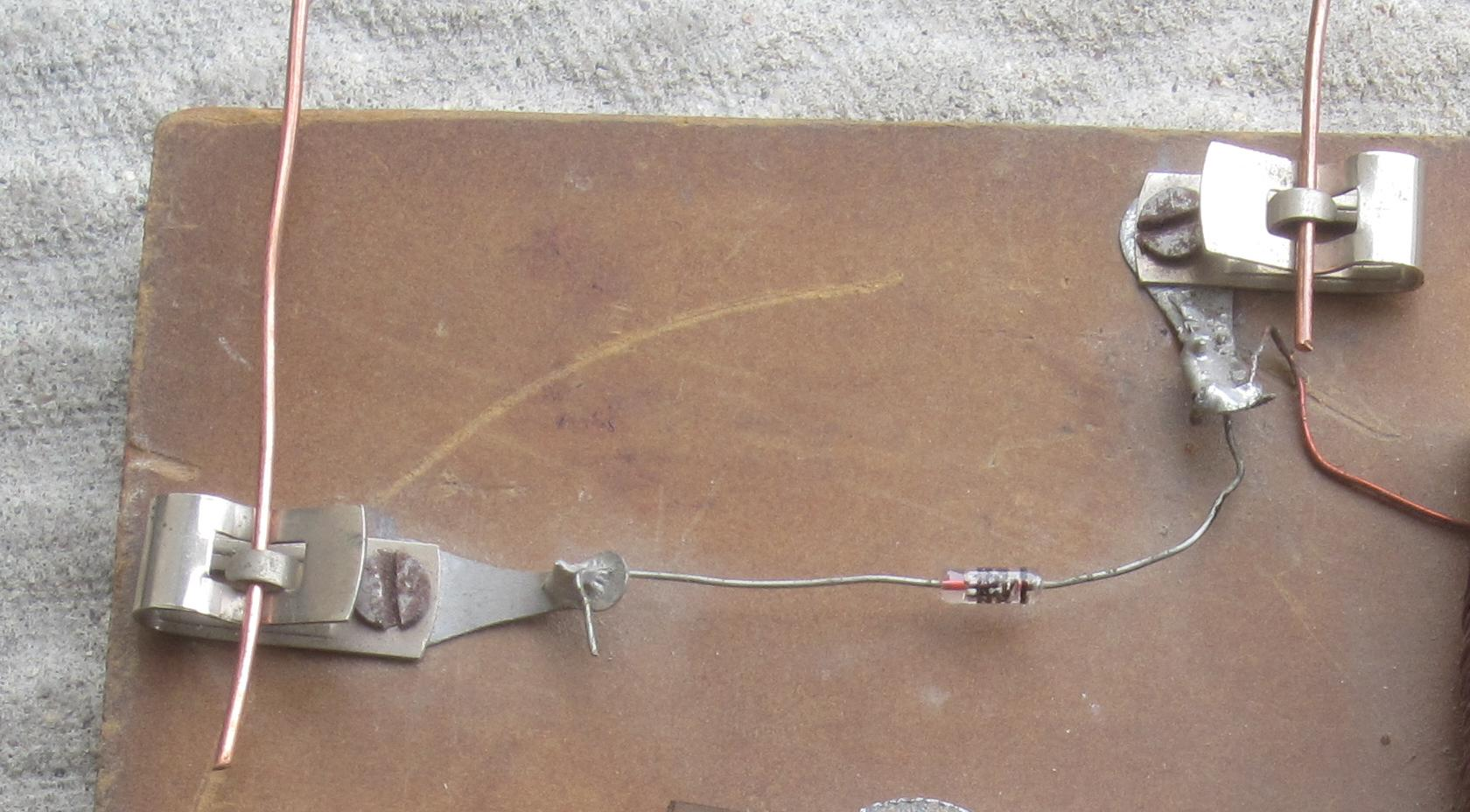
Fahnestock clips on home-made crystal radio, built in breadboard style. Modern diode detector installed between clips.

Fahnestock clips were used in early handmade radio receiver breadboard construction, model train power connections, and the like. They were also used as the connections on early dry cell batteries. Today, they have largely been supplanted by binding posts. However, they remain in use in breadboard educational electronic kits, where their ease of use and visible connections make them a popular way for science instructors to teach the creation of simple circuits, and most university physics departments still have them on apparatus.

Fahnestock clips are also used as safety devices on the arming wires of aircraft bombs; their grip on smooth bare steel wire is sufficient to prevent the wire from being withdrawn from a fuze during normal handling but light enough to allow the wire to be withdrawn when the weapon is released.

== See also ==
- Expansion spring
