= Lantern battery =

Type of battery

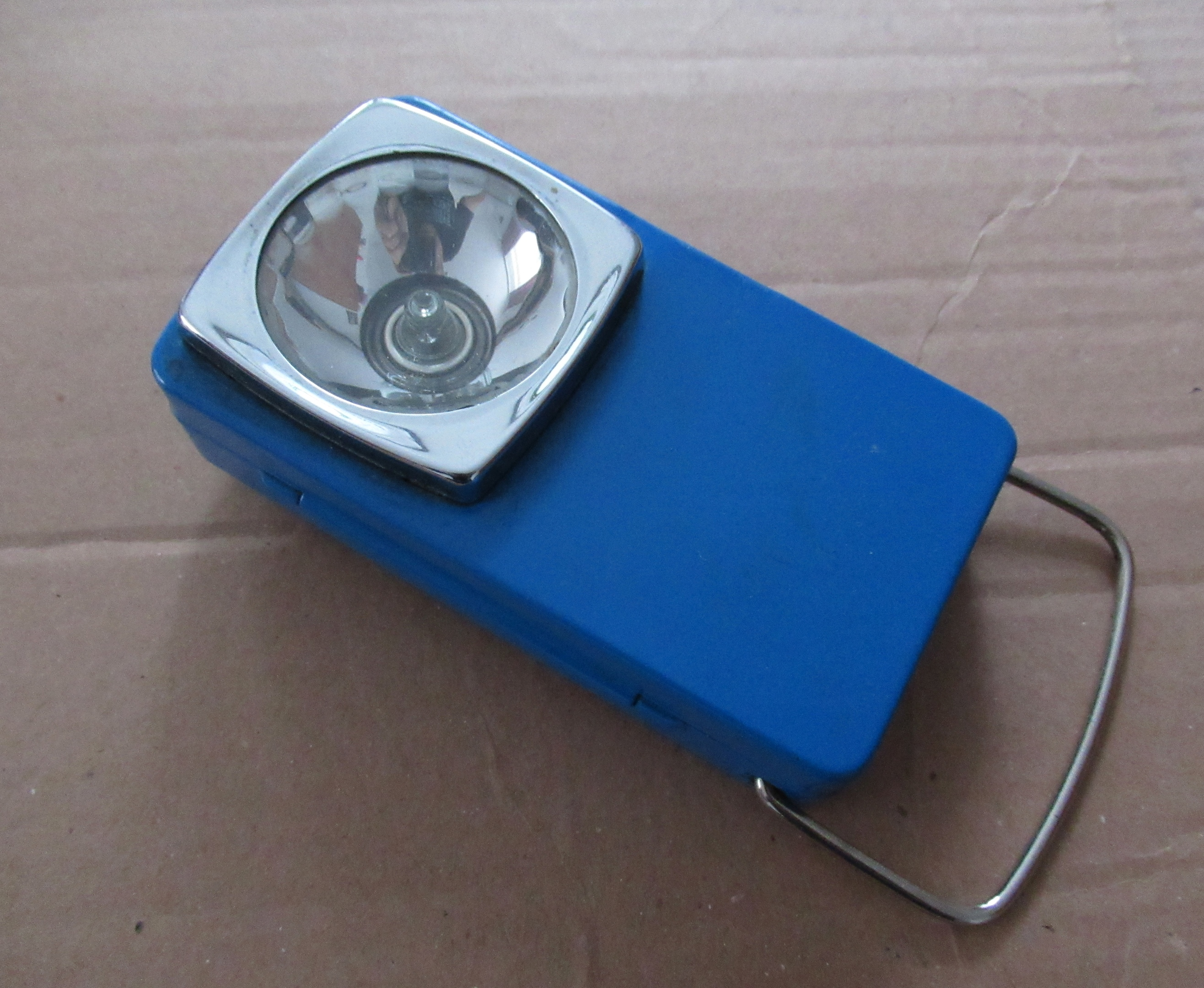
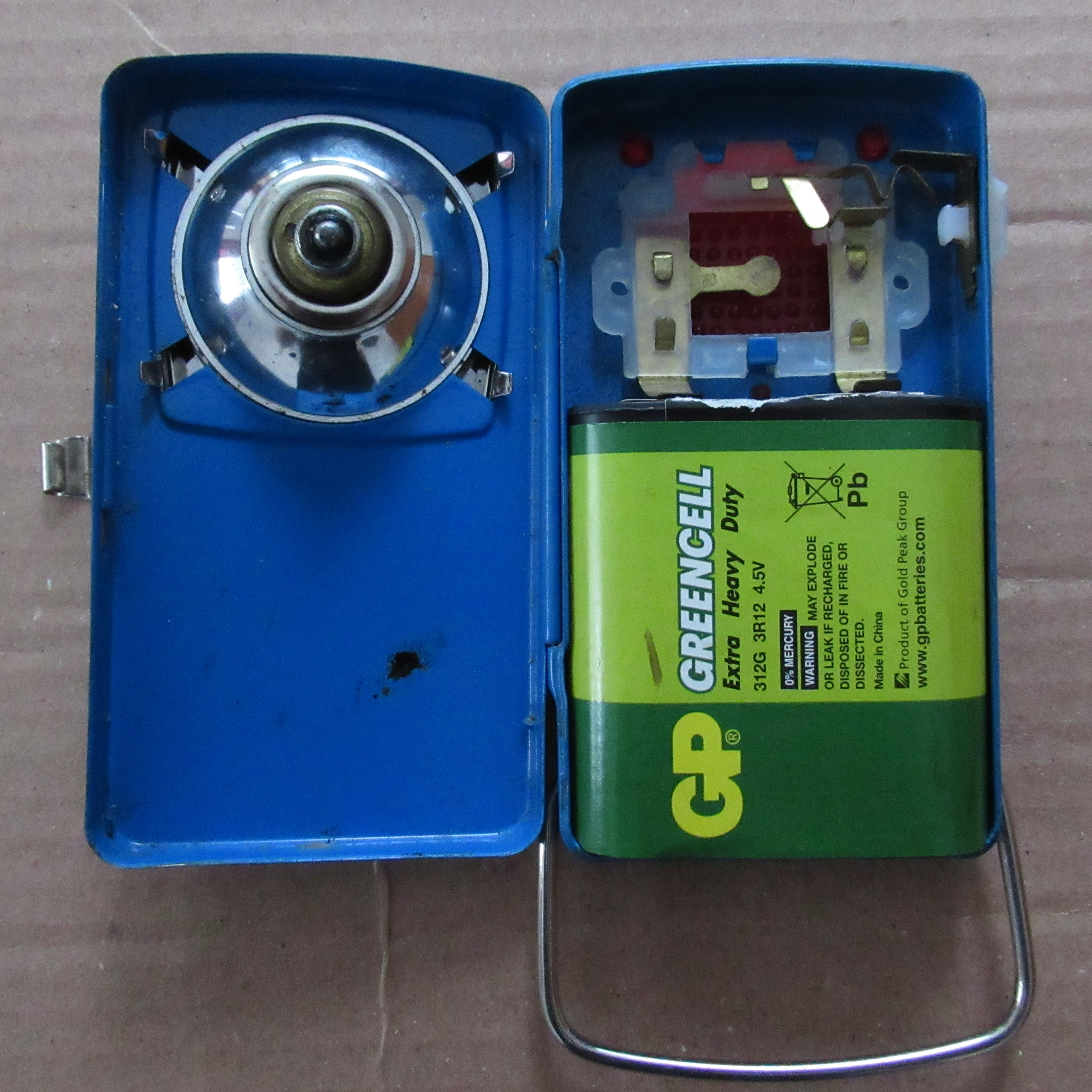
A pocket flashlight that uses a 4.5 V lantern battery

A lantern battery is a rectangular battery, typically an alkaline or zinc–carbon primary battery, used primarily in flashlights or lanterns. Lantern batteries are physically larger and consequently offer higher capacity than the more common flashlight batteries. Lantern batteries comprise multiple cells inside a housing.

The most common variant in the US is the 6-volt square-base battery with spring terminals. In Europe the most common one is the 4.5-volt flat pack.

== Common variants ==
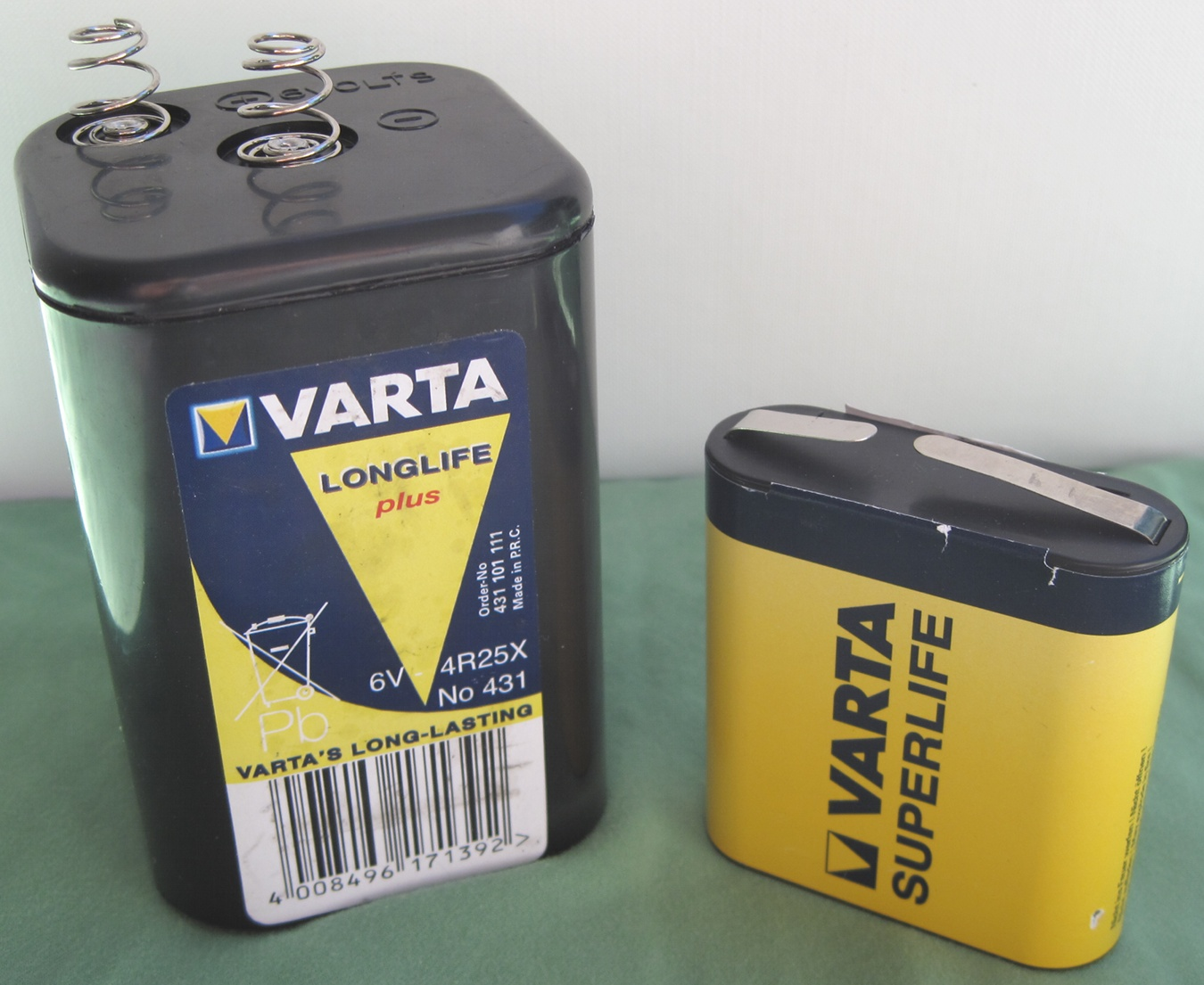
6-volt (left) and 4.5-volt (right) lantern batteries

=== 6-volt ===
The 6-volt variety typically has spring or screw terminals. Using various internal construction styles, the same package size may be made up with "D" size or "F" size cells, offering various capacities. A rechargeable version, comprising a three-cell sealed lead-acid battery with a lower capacity than primary versions, has also been marketed. They are also used in the construction industry for powering flashing lights at roadworks.

=== 4.5-volt ===
More common in Europe and Russia, the 4.5-volt variety is a smaller, flat-pack battery mostly used in flashlights. It uses two metal strips as terminals. The shorter strip is the positive (+) terminal. This variety may be marked as 3R12, 3336, KBS (Russian КБС), 3,7-FMC-0,50 (Russian 3,7-ФМЦ-0,50), or others.

=== 7.5-volt ===
The 7.5-volt version has screw terminals and a rectangular base. A carrying handle is usually connected between the terminals.

=== 12-volt ===
The 12-volt version has screw terminals and a rectangular base. Since it is 12-volt, this type can be used to power car accessories outside of an automobile, using extra wiring or an adapter.

== Specifications and designations ==
Name	IEC number	ANSI/NEDA	Manufacturer designations	Capacity (Ah)	Dimensions (mm)
4.5-volt	3R12, 3LR12	3R12, 3LR12, 4.5v	G3LR12, 1289/AD28, 210, GP312S, MN1203, 3336 (3336Л, 3336Х), КБС (КБС-Л-0,5, КБС-Х-0,7), 3,7-ФМЦ-0,50, 4,1-ФМЦ-0,50	3 – 4.8	67 × 62 × 22
6-volt, spring fitting	4R25X, 4LR25X	908AC, 908C, 908CD, 908D	EN1209, EN529, MN908, EV90, EV90HP, GP908, PJ996	12 – 26	115 × 68.2 × 68.2
6-volt, screw fitting	4R25Y, 4LR25Y	915A	EN528	26	109.5 × 66.7 × 66.7
6-volt, double	4R25-2, 4LR25-2	918A	EN521, MN918, GP918S, GP918G, 918/1231	52	125.4 × 132.5 × 73
7.5-volt	5LR25-2	903AC	EN715, PC903	43	97 × 184.2 × 103.2
12-volt	8R25	926	EN732, PC926	7.5	125.4 × 136.5 × 73

== See also ==
- List of battery types
