= Energy density extended reference table =

This is an extended version of the energy density table from the main Energy density page.

Energy densities table
Storage type	Specific energy (MJ/kg)	Energy density (MJ/L)	Peak recovery efficiency %	Practical recovery efficiency %
Arbitrary antimatter	89,875,517,874	depends on density		
Deuterium–tritium fusion	576,000,000			
Uranium-235 fissile isotope	144,000,000	1,500,000,000		
Natural uranium (99.3% U-238, 0.7% U-235) in fast breeder reactor	86,000,000			
Reactor-grade uranium (3.5% U-235) in light-water reactor	3,456,000			35%
Pu-238 α-decay	2,200,000			
Hf-178m2 isomer	1,326,000	17,649,060		
Natural uranium (0.7% U235) in light-water reactor	443,000			35%
Ta-180m isomer	41,340	689,964		
Metallic hydrogen (recombination energy)	216			
Specific orbital energy of low Earth orbit (approximate)	33.0			
Beryllium + oxygen	23.9			
Lithium + fluorine	23.75			
Octaazacubane potential explosive	22.9			
Hydrogen + oxygen	13.4			
Gasoline + oxygen	13.3			
Dinitroacetylene explosive – computed	9.8			
Octanitrocubane explosive	8.5	16.9		
Tetranitrotetrahedrane explosive – computed	8.3			
Heptanitrocubane explosive – computed	8.2			
Sodium (reacted with chlorine)	7.0349			
Hexanitrobenzene explosive	7			
Tetranitrocubane explosive – computed	6.95			
Ammonal (Al+NH_{4}NO_{3} oxidizer)	6.9	12.7		
Tetranitromethane + hydrazine bipropellant – computed	6.6			
Nitroglycerin	6.38	10.2		
ANFO–ANNM	6.26			
Lithium–air battery	6.12			
Octogen (HMX)	5.7	10.8		
TNT	4.610	6.92		
Copper thermite (Al + CuO as oxidizer)	4.13	20.9		
Thermite (powder Al + Fe_{2}O_{3} as oxidizer)	4.00	18.4		
ANFO	3.7			
Hydrogen peroxide decomposition (as monopropellant)	2.7	3.8		
Li-ion nanowire battery	2.54			95%
Lithium thionyl chloride battery	2.5			
Water (220.64 bar, 373.8 °C)	1.968	0.708		
Kinetic energy penetrator	1.9	30		
Lithium–sulfur battery	1.80	1.26		
Fluoride-ion battery	1.7	2.8		
Hydrogen closed cycle fuel cell	1.62			
Hydrazine decomposition (as monopropellant)	1.6	1.6		
Ammonium nitrate decomposition (as monopropellant)	1.4	2.5		
Molten salt	1			98%
Molecular spring (approximate)	1			
Lithium metal battery	0.83-1.01	1.98-2.09		
Sodium–sulfur battery	0.72	1.23		85%
Lithium-ion battery	0.46–0.72	0.83–3.6		95%
Sodium–nickel chloride battery, high temperature	0.56			
Zinc–manganese (alkaline) battery, long life design	0.4-0.59	1.15-1.43		
Silver-oxide battery	0.47	1.8		
Flywheel	0.36–0.5			
5.56 × 45 mm NATO bullet muzzle energy density	0.4	3.2		
Nickel–metal hydride battery (NiMH), low power design as used in consumer batteries	0.4	1.55		
Liquid nitrogen	0.349			
Water – enthalpy of fusion	0.334	0.334		
Zinc–bromine flow battery (ZnBr)	0.27			
Nickel–metal hydride battery (NiMH), high-power design as used in cars	0.250	0.493		
Nickel–cadmium battery (NiCd)	0.14	1.08		80%
Zinc–carbon battery	0.13	0.331		
Lead–acid battery	0.14	0.36		
Vanadium redox battery	0.09	0.1188		70-75%
Vanadium bromide redox battery	0.18	0.252		80%–90%
Ultracapacitor	0.0199	0.050		
Supercapacitor	0.01		80%–98.5%	39%–70%
Superconducting magnetic energy storage		0.008		>95%
Capacitor	0.002			
Neodymium magnet		0.003		
Ferrite magnet		0.0003		
Spring power (clock spring), torsion spring	0.0003	0.0006		
Storage type	Energy density by mass (MJ/kg)	Energy density by volume (MJ/L)	Peak recovery efficiency %	Practical recovery efficiency %
