= Fluoride battery =

- Specific energy: up to ~800 mAh/g
- Energy density: up to ~4800 Wh/L
- Cycle durability: Unknown (no commercial available devices)
- Nominal cell voltage: 1.5 - 5.0 V (Depends on electrode materials)

Fluoride batteries (also called fluoride shuttle batteries) are a rechargeable battery technology based on the shuttle of fluoride, the anion of fluorine, as ionic charge carriers.

This battery chemistry attracted renewed research interest in the mid-2010s because of its environmental friendliness, the avoidance of scarce and geographically strained mineral resources in electrode composition (e.g. cobalt and nickel), and high theoretical energy densities. In addition, since there is no metal plating and stripping, dendrite formation is negligible if high-capacity metallic anodes are used, with increased safety, cyclability, and energy storage capacity. Theoretically, a fluoride battery using a low cost electrode and a liquid electrolyte can have energy densities as high as ~800 mAh/g and ~4800 Wh/L.

Fluoride battery technology is in an early stage of development, and as of 2024 there are no commercially available devices. The main issues limiting actual performance are the high reactivity of naked fluoride in liquid electrolytes, low fluoride ionic conductivity of solid-state electrolytes at room temperature, and volume expansion of conversion-type electrodes that puts mechanical strain on cell components during charging-discharging cycling, leading to premature capacity fading. Despite the aforementioned limitations, the fluoride based technology represents a candidate for the next generation of electrochemical storage technology.

== History ==
Fluoride shuttling was proposed in 1974 during research on fluoride ionic conductivity of CaF_{2} at temperatures ranging from 400 to 500 °C.

Research continued during the 70s and early 80s, when other studies about fluoride conductivity of inorganic fluorides at high temperature were carried out. One practical application was made in 1976 by doping β-PbF_{2} with potassium fluoride. When employed in a galvanic cell as a solid-state electrolyte, this material allowed reaching open-circuit voltage close to the theoretical prediction, but failed to sustain a current when a load was applied.

Small advancements were made in the field of fluoride shuttling in the 1980s. A few studies reported working cells using solid-state fluoride conductive materials based on lanthanum, lead, or cerium fluoride. These cells still had unsatisfactory discharge capacity, high working temperature (up to 160 °C), and limited cell life when compared to commercially available batteries.

Fluoride batteries drew renewed attention from the mid-2010s, driven by the energy transition and needs of new energy storage devices. Improvements were made in both solid and liquid electrolytes.

== Working principle ==
The chemistry of a fluoride battery relies on reversible electrochemical fluorination of an electropositive metal (M') at the anode side, at the expense of a more noble metal fluoride (MF_{x}) at the cathode side.

Discharge process

At cathode (+)

$\ce{xe^- + MF_{x} -> M + xF-}$

At anode (-)

$\ce{xF^- + M' -> xe^- + M'F_{x}}$

Charge process

At cathode (-)

$\ce{xF^- + M -> xe^- + MF_{x}}$

At anode (+)

$\ce{xe^- + M'F_{x} -> M' + xF-}$

== Electrodes ==
=== Conversion-type electrodes ===
In conversion-type electrodes, the redox reaction that occurs changes the crystal structure of the electrode material itself. This process often leads to large variation in electrode volume, which can cause loss of contact with the current collector or loss of active surface area from aggregation, causing capacity fading. An advantage of conversion-type electrodes is the possibility to exploit more than one electron transfer per redox center, increasing the specific capacity.

This class includes some simple metal and transition metal fluorides that can exchange two or more electrons per mole, such as BiF_{3}, Bi_{0.8}Ba_{0.2}F_{2.8}, PbF_{2}, FeF_{3}, CuF_{2}, KBiF_{3} at the cathode side or Ca and Mg at the anode side.

=== Intercalation-type electrodes ===
In intercalation-type electrodes, fluoride ions are inserted into a vacancy in the crystal lattice of the electrode material, without changing its structure. In this case, the volume variation is greatly reduced, making these materials more stable. This increase in stability comes at the cost of the electron transfer usually being limited to one per redox center, reducing the available specific capacity.

== Electrolytes ==
=== Liquid electrolytes ===
Liquid electrolytes for fluoride batteries would offer a solution to the problem arising from the volumetric expansion of electrodes and reduce operating temperature, due to intrinsic higher ion mobility, which results in high ion conductivity.

==== Inorganic fluorides-based electrolytes ====
Inorganic-based liquid electrolytes are made by dissolving alkali metal fluorides in an organic aprotic solvent, but the low solubility of inorganic fluorides in common battery electrolyte solvents leads to poor ionic conductivity.

To enhance salt solubility and thus ionic conductivity, boron-based anion acceptors were used in organic solvents. For example, an electrolyte based on cesium fluoride dissolved in tetraglyme with different anion acceptors, including triphenylboroxines and triphenylboranes, was discovered.

==== Organic fluorides-based electrolytes ====
Organic-based liquid electrolytes were developed by dissolving tetraalkylammonium fluoride salts in organic aprotic solvents. The main issue is the high nucleophilic behavior of dissolved fluoride that reacts easily with β-hydrogen of alkyl groups via the Hofmann elimination mechanism.

To obtain a stable organic-based electrolyte, ammonium salts without β-hydrogen were employed and tested, such as N,N,N-trimethyl-N-neopentylammonium fluoride dissolved at high concentration in a partially fluorinated ether.

=== Solid electrolytes ===
Most known fluoride conducting solid electrolytes achieve insufficient ionic conductivity, even at high temperatures (up to 160 °C), for the possibility of commercial use. Moreover, the stiffness of these materials can't accommodate the high volumetric expansion of conversion cathodes.

==== Tysonite-type rare-earth fluorides ====
Rare-earth fluorides with tysonite-type structure (RE_{1−x}M_{x}F_{3−x} where RE is a rare-earth among La, Ce, Sm, and M is a second group metal like Ba, Ca, or Sr) have been studied, because of their wide electrochemical stability windows (up to 4 V vs Li^{+}/Li).

As an example, in 2017, barium-doped lanthanum fluoride (LBF) was synthesized with a ball milling technique, reaching an ionic conductivity of around 10^{−5} S cm^{−1} at room temperature. This was still lower than conventional liquid electrolytes used in commercially available Li-ion batteries. Similar results in terms of ionic conductivity were achieved with cerium fluoride doped with strontium fluoride or calcium-doped samarium fluoride.

==== Alkaline-earth fluorides ====
Among alkaline-earth fluorides, barium-tin fluoride (BaSnF_{4}) has been investigated because of its relatively high ionic conductivity at room temperature, on the order of 10^{−4} S cm^{−1}. Despite the increased ionic conductivity, the low electrochemical stability window of Sn^{2+} prevents the use of reducing metals as anodes, decreasing the maximum cell potential, and consequently, the energy density.

In 2019, researchers obtained a rechargeable fluoride battery with a BaSnF_{4} solid electrolyte covered with an interlayer of LBF, extending the electrochemical stability windows of BaSnF_{4}.

== See also ==
- Comparison of commercial battery types
- List of battery types
- Lithium-ion battery
- Rechargeable lithium metal battery
