= Lithium metal battery =

Non-rechargeable battery using lithium metal as anode

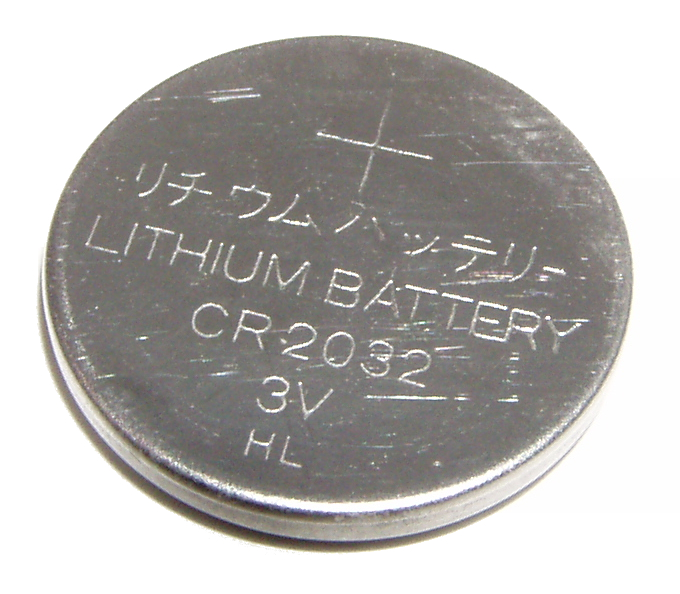
CR2032 lithium button cell battery

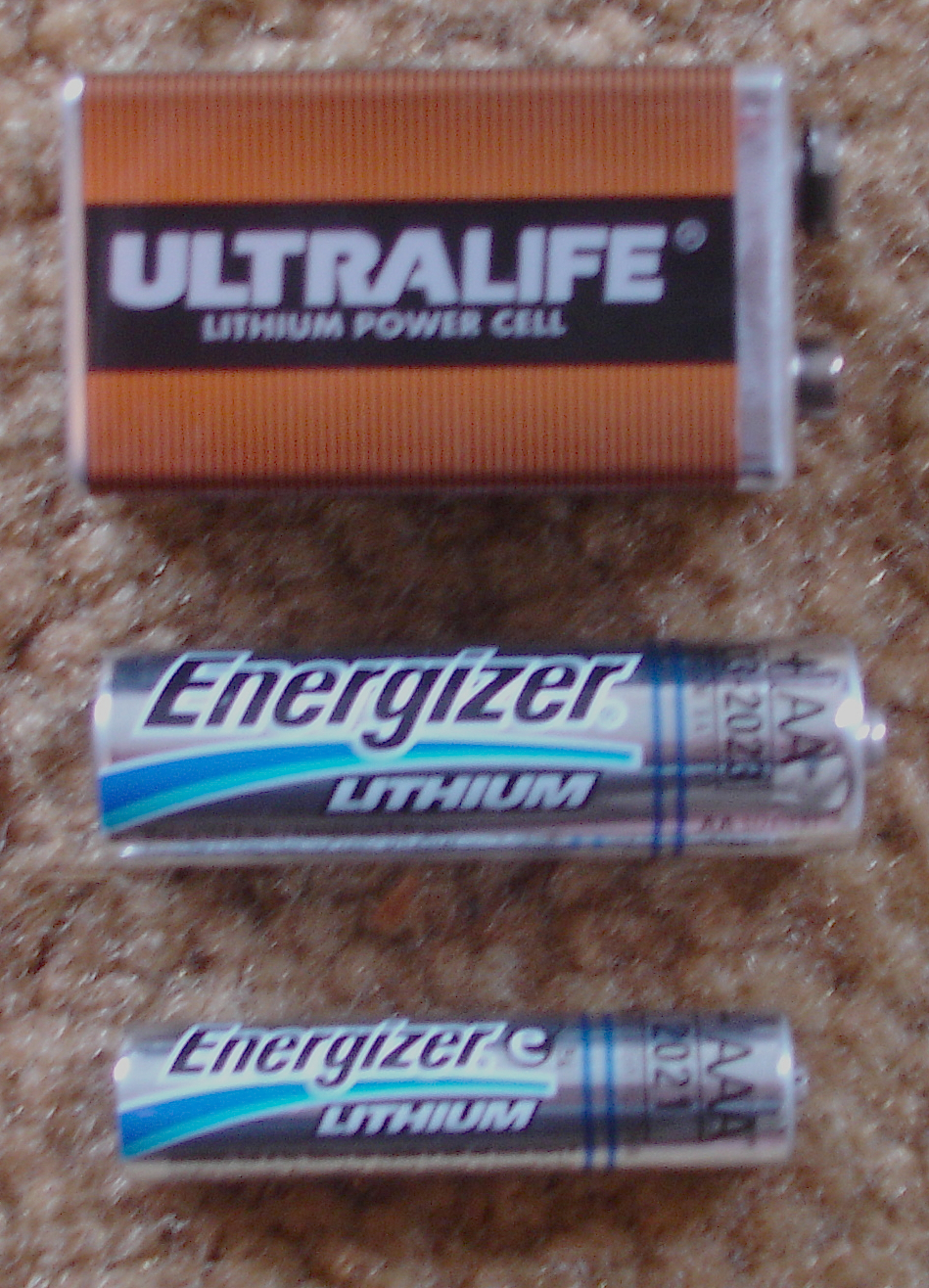
Lithium 9 volt, AA, and AAA sizes. The top object is a battery of three lithium-manganese dioxide (Li–MnO_{2}) cells; the bottom two are lithium-iron disulfide (Li–FeS_{2}) cells and are compatible with 1.5-volt alkaline cells.

Lithium metal batteries are nonrechargeable primary batteries that have metallic lithium as an anode. The name refers to the metal to distinguish them from rechargeable lithium-ion batteries, which use lithiated metal oxides as the cathode material. Although most lithium metal batteries are non-rechargeable, rechargeable lithium metal batteries are also under development. Since 2007, Dangerous Goods Regulations differentiate between lithium metal batteries (UN 3090) and lithium-ion batteries (UN 3480).

They stand apart from other batteries in their high charge density and high cost per unit. Depending on the design and chemical compounds used, lithium cells can produce voltages from 1.5 V (comparable to a zinc–carbon or alkaline battery) to about 3.7 V.

Disposable primary lithium batteries must be distinguished from secondary lithium-ion or a lithium-polymer, which are rechargeable batteries and contain no metallic lithium. Lithium metal batteries, by contrast, are defined by the use of metallic lithium as the anode. Pure lithium will instantly react with water, or even moisture in the air; the lithium in lithium-ion batteries is a less reactive compound.

Lithium batteries are widely used in portable consumer electronic devices. The term "lithium battery" refers to a family of lithium-metal chemistries, comprising many types of cathodes and electrolytes, all of which use metallic lithium as the anode. The battery requires from 0.15 to 0.3 kilograms (5.3 to 10.6 oz) of lithium per kWh. These primary systems use a charged cathode, an electroactive material with crystallographic vacancies that are gradually filled during discharge.

Diagram of lithium button cell battery with MnO_{2} (manganese dioxide) at cathode

The most common type of lithium cell used in consumer applications uses metallic lithium as the anode, manganese dioxide as the cathode, and a lithium salt dissolved in an organic solvent as the electrolyte.

== Chemistries ==
This table is dominated by lithium-ion, not lithium-metal, chemistries—it's inclusive rather than focused on lithium-metal batteries.

Chemistry	Cathode	Electrolyte	Nominal voltage	Open-circuit voltage	Wh/kg	Wh/L
Li–MnO_{2} (IEC code: C), "CR"	Heat-treated manganese dioxide	Lithium perchlorate in an organic solvent (propylene carbonate and dimethoxyethane in many common cells)	3 V	3.3 V	280	580
Li–MnO_{2} (IEC code: C), "CR"	"Li–Mn". The most common consumer-grade lithium battery, about 80% of the lithium battery market. Uses inexpensive materials. Suitable for low-drain, long-life, low-cost applications. High energy density per both mass and volume. Operational temperature ranges from -30 °C to 60 °C. Can deliver high pulse currents. With discharge, the internal impedance rises and the terminal voltage decreases. High self-discharge at high temperatures. 1,2-Dimethoxyethane is a REACH candidate substance of very high concern.					
Li–(CF)_{x} (IEC code: B), "BR"	Carbon monofluoride	Lithium tetrafluoroborate in propylene carbonate, dimethoxyethane, or gamma-butyrolactone	3 V	3.1 V	360–500	1,000
Li–(CF)_{x} (IEC code: B), "BR"	Cathode material formed by high-temperature intercalation of fluorine gas into graphite powder. Compared to manganese dioxide (CR), which has the same nominal voltage, it provides more reliability. Used for low to moderate current applications in memory and clock backup batteries. Used in aerospace applications, qualified for space since 1976, military applications both terrestrial and marine, in missiles, and in artificial cardiac pacemakers. Operates up to around 80 °C. Very low self-discharge (<0.5%/year at 60 °C, <1%/yr at 85 °C). Developed in the 1970s by Matsushita.					
Li–FeS_{2} (IEC code: F), "FR"	Iron disulfide	Propylene carbonate, dioxolane, dimethoxyethane	1.4–1.6 V	1.8 V	297	
Li–FeS_{2} (IEC code: F), "FR"	"Lithium-iron", "Li/Fe". Called "voltage-compatible" lithium, it can work as a replacement for alkaline batteries with its 1.5 V nominal voltage. As such, Energizer lithium cells of AA and AAA size employ this chemistry. 2.5 times higher lifetime for high current discharge regime than alkaline batteries, better storage life due to lower self-discharge(10–20 years). FeS_{2} is cheap. Cathode is often designed as a paste of iron sulfide powder mixed with powdered graphite. Variant is Li–CuFeS_{2}.					
Li–SOCl_{2} (IEC code: E)	Thionyl chloride	Lithium tetrachloroaluminate in thionyl chloride	3.5 V	3.65 V	500–700	1,200
Li–SOCl_{2} (IEC code: E)	Liquid cathode. For low-temperature applications. Can operate down to −55 °C, where it retains over 50% of its rated capacity. A negligible amount of gas generated in nominal use, a limited amount under abuse. Has relatively high internal impedance and limited short-circuit current. High energy density, about 500 Wh/kg. Toxic. Electrolyte reacts with water. Low-current cells are used for portable electronics and memory backup. High-current cells are used in military applications. In long storage, forms passivation layer on the anode, which may lead to temporary voltage delay when put into service. High cost and safety concerns limit use in civilian applications. Can explode when shorted. Underwriters Laboratories require a trained technician for the replacement of these batteries. Hazardous waste, Class 9 Hazmat shipment. Not used for consumer or general-purpose batteries.					
Li–SOCl_{2},BrCl, Li–BCX (IEC code: E)	Thionyl chloride with bromine chloride	Lithium tetrachloroaluminate in thionyl chloride	3.7–3.8 V	3.9 V	350	770
Li–SOCl_{2},BrCl, Li–BCX (IEC code: E)	Liquid cathode. A variant of the thionyl chloride battery, with 300 mV higher voltage. The higher voltage drops back to 3.5 V soon as the bromine chloride gets consumed during the first 10–20% of the discharge. The cells with added bromine chloride are thought to be safer when abused.					
Li–SO_{2}Cl_{2} (IEC code: Y)	Sulfuryl chloride	Lithium tetrachloroaluminate in sulfuryl chloride	3.7 V	3.95 V	330	720
Li–SO_{2}Cl_{2} (IEC code: Y)	Liquid cathode. Similar to thionyl chloride. Discharge does not result in a build-up of elemental sulfur, which is thought to be involved in some hazardous reactions, therefore sulfuryl chloride batteries may be safer. Commercial deployment is hindered by the tendency of the electrolyte to corrode the lithium anodes, reducing the shelf life. Chlorine is added to some cells to make them more resistant to abuse. Sulfuryl chloride cells give less maximum current than thionyl chloride ones, due to polarization of the carbon cathode. Sulfuryl chloride reacts violently with water, releasing hydrogen chloride and sulfuric acid.					
Li–SO_{2} (IEC code: W)	Sulfur dioxide on teflon-bonded carbon	Lithium bromide in sulfur dioxide with small amount of acetonitrile	2.85 V	3.0 V	250	400
Li–SO_{2} (IEC code: W)	Liquid cathode. Can operate down to −55 °C and up to +70 °C. Contains liquid SO_{2} at high pressure. Requires safety vent, can explode in some conditions. High energy density. High cost. At low temperatures and high currents, performs better than Li–MnO_{2}. Toxic. Acetonitrile forms lithium cyanide, and can form hydrogen cyanide in high temperatures. Used in military applications. Addition of bromine monochloride can boost the voltage to 3.9 V and increase energy density.					
Li–I_{2}	Iodine that has been mixed and heated with poly-2-vinylpyridine (P2VP) to form a solid organic charge transfer complex.	A solid monomolecular layer of crystalline Lithium iodide that conducts lithium ions from the anode to the cathode but does not conduct Iodine.	2.8 V	3.1 V		
Li–I_{2}	Solid electrolyte. Very high reliability and low self-discharge rate. Used in medical applications that need a long life, e.g. pacemakers. Does not generate gas even under a short circuit. Solid-state chemistry, limited short-circuit current, suitable only for low-current applications. Terminal voltage decreases with the degree of discharge due to precipitation of lithium iodide.					
Li–Ag_{2}CrO_{4}	Silver chromate	Lithium perchlorate solution	3.1/2.6 V	3.45 V		
Li–Ag_{2}CrO_{4}	Very high reliability. Has a 2.6 V plateau after reaching a certain percentage of discharge provides early warning of impending discharge. Developed specifically for medical applications, for example, implanted pacemakers.					
Li–Ag_{2}V_{4}O_{11}, Li–SVO, Li–CSVO	Silver oxide+vanadium pentoxide (SVO)	lithium hexafluorophosphate or lithium hexafluoroarsenate in propylene carbonate with dimethoxyethane				
Li–Ag_{2}V_{4}O_{11}, Li–SVO, Li–CSVO	Used in medical applications, like implantable defibrillators, neurostimulators, and drug infusion systems. Also projected for use in other electronics, such as emergency locator transmitters. High energy density. Long shelf life. Capable of continuous operation at a nominal temperature of 37 °C. Two-stage discharge with a plateau. Output voltage decreases proportionally to the degree of discharge. Resistant to abuse.					
Li–CuO (IEC code: G), "GR"	Copper(II) oxide	Lithium perchlorate dissolved in dioxolane	1.5 V	2.4 V		
Li–CuO (IEC code: G), "GR"	Can operate up to 150 °C. Developed as a replacement of zinc–carbon and alkaline batteries. "Voltage up" problem, the high difference between open-circuit and nominal voltage. Produced until the mid-1990s, replaced by lithium–iron sulfide. Current use is limited.					
Li–Cu_{4}O(PO_{4})_{2}	Copper oxyphosphate					
Li–Cu_{4}O(PO_{4})_{2}	See Li–CuO					
Li–CuS	Copper sulfide	Lithium salt or a salt such as a tetraalkylammonium chloride dissolved in LiClO_{4} in an organic solvent that is a mixture of 1,2-dimethoxy ethane, 1,3-dioxolane and 2,5-dimethyloxazole as a stabilizer	1.5 V			
Li–PbCuS	Lead sulfide and copper sulfide		1.5 V	2.2 V		
Li–FeS	Iron sulfide	Propylene carbonate, dioxolane, dimethoxyethane	1.5–1.2 V			
Li–FeS	"Lithium-iron", "Li/Fe". used as a replacement for alkaline batteries. See lithium-iron disulfide.					
Li–Bi_{2}Pb_{2}O_{5}	Lead bismuthate		1.5 V	1.8 V		
Li–Bi_{2}Pb_{2}O_{5}	Replacement of silver-oxide batteries, with higher energy density, lower tendency to leak, and better performance at higher temperatures.					
Li–Bi_{2}O_{3}	Bismuth trioxide		1.5 V	2.04 V		
Li–V_{2}O_{5}	Vanadium pentoxide		3.3/2.4 V	3.4 V	120/260	300/660
Li–V_{2}O_{5}	Two discharge plateaus. Low-pressure. Rechargeable. Used in reserve batteries.					
Li–CuCl_{2}	Copper chloride	LiAlCl_{4} or LiGaCl_{4} in SO_{2}, a liquid, inorganic, non-aqueous electrolyte.				
Li–CuCl_{2}	Rechargeable. This cell has three voltage plateaus as it discharges (3.3 V, 2.9 V, and 2.5 V). Discharging below the first plateau reduces the life of the cell. The complex salt dissolved in SO_{2} has a lower vapor pressure at room temperature than pure sulfur dioxide, making the construction simpler and safer than Li–SO_{2} batteries.					
Li/Al–MnO_{2}, "ML"	Manganese dioxide		3 V			
Li/Al–MnO_{2}, "ML"	Rechargeable. Anode is a Lithium-Aluminum alloy. Mainly marketed by Maxell.					
Li/Al–V_{2}O_{5}, "VL"	Vanadium pentoxide		3 V			
Li/Al–V_{2}O_{5}, "VL"	Rechargeable. Anode is a Li–Al alloy.					
Li–Se	Selenium	non-aqueous carbonate electrolytes	1.9 V			
Li–air	Porous carbon	Organic, aqueous, glass–ceramic (polymer–ceramic composites)			1,800–660	1,600–600
Li–air	Rechargeable. As of 2012, no commercial implementation is available due to difficulties in achieving multiple discharge cycles without losing capacity. There are multiple possible implementations, each having different energy capacities, advantages and disadvantages. In November 2015, a team of University of Cambridge researchers furthered work on lithium-air batteries by developing a charging process capable of prolonging the battery life and battery efficiency. Their work resulted in a battery that delivered high energy densities, more than 90% efficiency, and could be recharged for up to 2,000 times. The lithium-air batteries are described as the "ultimate" batteries because they propose a high theoretical energy density of up to ten times the energy offered by regular lithium-ion batteries. They were first developed in a research environment by Abraham & Jiang in 1996. Toyota promoted a vehicle with a working solid-state battery in September 2021; due to cost, the company plans to use it in a hybrid vehicle in 2025, before scaling up to fully electric vehicles. Other companies working on commercialization include QuantumScape and Solid Power (funded by Ford Motor Company and BMW).					
Li–FePO_{4}	Lithium iron phosphate	ethylene carbonate–dimethyl carbonate (EC–DMC) 1–1 lithium perchlorate (LiClO_{4}) 1M	3.0 ~ 3.2 V	3.2 V	90–160	325 Wh/L (1,200 kJ/L)
Li–FePO_{4}	The specific capacity of LiFePO_{4} is higher than that of the related lithium cobalt oxide (LiCoO_{2}) chemistry, but its energy density is less due to its lower operating voltage. The main drawback of LiFePO_{4} is its low electrical conductivity. Because of low cost, low toxicity, well-defined performance, long-term stability, etc. LiFePO_{4} is finding a number of roles in vehicle use, utility scale stationary applications, and backup power.					

The University of California, San Diego has developed an electrolyte chemistry that allows lithium batteries to run at temperatures as low as −60 °C (−76 °F). The electrolytes also enable electrochemical capacitors to run as low as −80 °C (−112 °F). Previous low-temperature limit is −40 °C (−40 °F). High performance at room temperature is still maintained. This may improve energy density and safety of lithium batteries and electrochemical capacitors.

== Applications ==
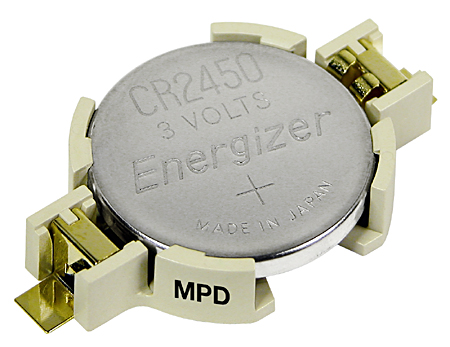
CR2450 battery, 24 mm (0.94 in) in diameter and 5.0 mm (0.20 in) thick

Lithium batteries find application in many long-life, critical devices, such as pacemakers and other implantable electronic medical devices. These devices use specialized lithium-iodide batteries designed to last 15 or more years. But for other, less critical applications, such as in toys, the lithium battery may actually outlast the device. In such cases, an expensive lithium battery may not be cost-effective.

Lithium batteries can be used in place of ordinary alkaline cells in many devices, such as clocks and cameras. Although they are more costly, lithium cells will provide much longer life, thereby minimizing battery replacement. However, attention must be paid to the higher voltage produced by lithium cells before using them as a drop-in replacement in devices that normally use ordinary zinc cells.

Lithium batteries also prove valuable in oceanographic applications. While lithium battery packs are considerably more expensive than standard oceanographic packs, they hold up to three times the capacity of alkaline packs. The high cost of servicing remote oceanographic instrumentation (usually by ships) often justifies this higher cost.

=== Sizes and formats ===
Small lithium batteries are very commonly used in small, portable electronic devices, such as PDAs, watches, camcorders, digital cameras, thermometers, calculators, personal computer BIOS (firmware), communication equipment and remote car locks. They are available in many shapes and sizes, with a common variety being the 3-volt "coin" type manganese variety. The number on these batteries indicates their size: the first two digits are the diameter in millimeters, and the last two are the height in tenths of a millimeter. For instance, a CR2032 battery is 20 mm (0.79 in) in diameter and 3.2 mm (0.13 in) thick.

The heavy electrical demands of many of these devices make lithium batteries a particularly attractive option. In particular, lithium batteries can easily support the brief, high-current demands of devices such as digital cameras, and they maintain a higher voltage for longer than alkaline cells.

=== Popularity ===
Lithium primary batteries account for 28% of all primary battery sales in Japan but only 1% of all battery sales in Switzerland. In the EU only 0.5% of all battery sales including secondary types are lithium primaries.

== Safety issues and regulation ==
The computer industry's drive to increase battery capacity can test the limits of sensitive components such as the membrane separator, a polyethylene or polypropylene film that is only 20–25 μm thick. The energy density of lithium batteries has more than doubled since their introduction in 1991. When the battery is designed to contain more material, the separator can be under stress.

=== Rapid-discharge problems ===
Lithium batteries can provide extremely high currents and can discharge very rapidly when short-circuited. Although this is useful in applications where high currents are required, a too-rapid discharge of a lithium battery – especially if cobalt is present in the cells' design – can result in overheating of the battery (that lowers the electrical resistance of any cobalt content within the cell), rupture, and even an explosion. Lithium-thionyl chloride batteries are particularly susceptible to this type of discharge. Consumer batteries usually incorporate overcurrent or thermal protection or vents to prevent an explosion.

=== Air travel ===
On January 1, 2013, IATA introduced much stricter regulations on the carriage of lithium batteries by air. They were adopted by the International Postal Union; however, some countries, e.g., the UK, have decided not to accept lithium batteries unless they are included with the equipment they power.

Because of the above risks, shipping and carriage of lithium batteries are restricted in some situations, particularly the transport of lithium batteries by air.

The United States Transportation Security Administration announced restrictions effective January 1, 2008, on lithium batteries in checked and carry-on luggage. The rules prohibit lithium batteries not installed in a device from being checked baggage and restrict them in carry-on baggage by total lithium content.

Australia Post prohibited transport of lithium batteries in air mail during 2010.

UK regulations for the transport of lithium batteries were amended by the National Chemical Emergency Centre in 2009.

In late 2009, at least some postal administrations restricted airmail shipping (including Express Mail Service) of lithium batteries, lithium-ion batteries, and products containing these (such as laptops and cell phones). Among these countries are Hong Kong, the United States, and Japan.

=== Methamphetamine labs ===
Unused lithium batteries provide a convenient source of lithium metal for use as a reducing agent in methamphetamine labs. Specifically, lithium metal reduces pseudoephedrine and ephedrine to methamphetamine in the Birch reduction method, which employs solutions of alkali metals dissolved in anhydrous ammonia.

Some jurisdictions have passed laws to restrict lithium battery sales or asked businesses to make voluntary restrictions in an attempt to help curb the creation of illegal meth labs. In 2004, Wal-Mart stores were reported to limit the sale of disposable lithium batteries to three packages in Missouri and four packages in other states.

=== Health issues on ingestion ===
Button cell batteries are attractive to small children and are often ingested. In the past twenty years, although there has not been an increase in the total number of button cell batteries ingested in a year, researchers have noted a 6.7-fold increase in the risk that an ingestion would result in a moderate or major complication and 12.5-fold increase in fatalities comparing the last decade to the previous one.

KEEP OUT OF REACH OF CHILDREN icon required by IEC 60086-4 on coin cells (lithium button cells) with 20 mm diameter or larger

The primary mechanism of injury in button battery ingestions is the generation of hydroxide ions at the anode, which cause severe chemical burns. This is an electrochemical effect of the intact battery, and does not require the casing to be breached or the contents released. Complications include oesophageal strictures, tracheo-oesophageal fistulas, vocal cord paralysis, aorto-oesophageal fistulas, and death. The majority of ingestions are not witnessed; presentations are non-specific; battery voltage has increased; the 20 to 25 mm button battery size are more likely to become lodged at the cricopharyngeal junction; and severe tissue damage can occur within two hours. The 3 V, 20 mm CR2032 lithium battery has been implicated in many of the complications from button battery ingestions by children of less than four years of age.

While the only cure for an esophageal impaction is endoscopic removal, a 2018 study out of Children's Hospital of Philadelphia by Rachel R. Anfang and colleagues found that early and frequent ingestion of honey or sucralfate suspension prior to the battery's removal can reduce the injury severity to a significant degree. As a result, US-based National Capital Poison Center (Poison Control) recommends the use of honey or sucralfate after known or suspected ingestions to reduce the risk and severity of injury to esophagus, and consequently its nearby structures.

Button batteries can also cause significant necrotic injury when stuck in the nose or ears. Prevention efforts in the US by the National Button Battery Task force in cooperation with industry leaders have led to changes in packaging and battery compartment design in electronic devices to reduce a child's access to these batteries. However, there still is a lack of awareness across the general population and medical community to its dangers. Central Manchester University Hospital Trust warns that "a lot of doctors are unaware that this can cause harm".

== Disposal ==
Regulations for disposal and recycling of batteries vary widely; local governments may have additional requirements beyond national regulations. In the United States, one manufacturer of lithium iron disulfide primary batteries advises that consumer quantities of used cells may be discarded in municipal waste, as the battery does not contain any substances controlled by US Federal regulations. Most lithium batteries, are, however, classified as hazardous waste due to the possibility of fire. Another manufacturer states that while "button" size lithium batteries contain perchlorate, which is regulated as a hazardous waste in California, regulated quantities would not be found in typical consumer use of these cells.

The EPA, however, states that, due to limited supply and rising demand, lithium batteries should always be recycled when possible. As well, a rupture in a battery poses a potential fire hazard, thus the EPA states that the average consumer should take lithium batteries to specialized lithium or hazardous materials facilities.

As lithium in used-but-non-working (i.e., extended-storage) button cells is still likely to be in the cathode cup, it is possible to extract commercially useful quantities of the metal from such cells, along with manganese dioxide and specialist plastics. Some also alloy the lithium with magnesium (Mg) to cut costs.

Since there has been an exponential increase in demand for lithium batteries over time, there have been pushes to find better ways to recycle lithium batteries.

== Rechargeable batteries ==
Rechargeable lithium metal batteries are secondary lithium metal batteries. They have metallic lithium as a negative electrode. The high specific capacity of lithium metal (3,860 mAh g^{−1}), very low redox potential (−3.040 V versus standard hydrogen electrode) and low density (0.59 g cm^{−3}) make it the ideal negative material for high energy density battery technologies. Rechargeable lithium metal batteries can have a long run time due to the high charge density of lithium. Several companies and many academic research groups are currently researching and developing rechargeable lithium metal batteries as they are considered a leading pathway for development beyond lithium-ion batteries. Some rechargeable lithium metal batteries employ a liquid electrolyte and some employ a solid-state electrolyte.

== See also ==
- List of battery types
- List of battery sizes
- Comparison of battery types
- Battery holder
- Battery recycling
- High capacity oceanographic lithium battery pack
- Lithium–air battery
- Lithium ion manganese oxide battery
- Lithium ion polymer battery
- Lithium iron phosphate battery
- Lithium–sulfur battery
- Lithium-titanate battery
- Nanoarchitectures for lithium-ion batteries
- Polyoxyethylene
- Thin film rechargeable lithium battery
