= KJ/kg =

kJ/kg may refer to:

- kilojoules per kilogram
- The SI derived units of specific energy
- Specific Internal energy
- Specific kinetic energy
- Heat of fusion
- Heat of combustion
