= Specific energy density =

Specific energy density may refer to:

- Energy density, energy per unit volume
- Specific energy, energy per unit mass
