= Energy density =

Energy per volume

- SI unit: J/m^{3}
- Other units: J/L, W⋅h/L, Pa
- In SI base units: kg⋅m^{−1}⋅s^{−2}
- Derivations from other quantities: U = E/V
- Dimension: $\mathsf{L}^{-1} \mathsf{M} \mathsf{T}^{-2}$

In physics, energy density is the quotient between the amount of energy stored in a given system or contained in a given region of space and the volume of the system or region considered. Often only the useful or extractable energy is measured. It is sometimes confused with stored energy per unit mass, which is called specific energy or gravimetric energy density.

There are different types of energy stored, corresponding to a particular type of reaction. In order of the typical magnitude of the energy stored, examples of reactions are: nuclear, chemical (including electrochemical), electrical, pressure, material deformation or in electromagnetic fields. Nuclear reactions take place in stars and nuclear power plants, both of which derive energy from the binding energy of nuclei. Chemical reactions are used by organisms to derive energy from food and by automobiles from the combustion of gasoline. Liquid hydrocarbons (fuels such as gasoline, diesel and kerosene) are today the densest way known to economically store and transport chemical energy at a large scale (1 kg of diesel fuel burns with the oxygen contained in ≈ 15 kg of air). Burning local biomass fuels supplies household energy needs (cooking fires, oil lamps, etc.) worldwide. Electrochemical reactions are used by devices such as laptop computers and mobile phones to release energy from batteries.

Energy per unit volume has the same physical units as pressure, and in many situations is synonymous. For example, the energy density of a magnetic field may be expressed as and behaves like a physical pressure. The energy required to compress a gas to a certain volume may be determined by multiplying the difference between the gas pressure and the external pressure by the change in volume. A pressure gradient describes the potential to perform work on the surroundings by converting internal energy to work until equilibrium is reached.

In cosmological and other contexts in general relativity, the energy densities considered relate to the elements of the stress–energy tensor and therefore do include the rest mass energy as well as energy densities associated with pressure.

== Chemical energy ==
When discussing the chemical energy contained, there are different types which can be quantified depending on the intended purpose. One is the theoretical total amount of thermodynamic work that can be derived from a system, at a given temperature and pressure imposed by the surroundings, called exergy. Another is the theoretical amount of electrical energy that can be derived from reactants that are at room temperature and atmospheric pressure. This is given by the change in standard Gibbs free energy. But as a source of heat or for use in a heat engine, the relevant quantity is the change in standard enthalpy or the heat of combustion.

There are two kinds of heat of combustion:

- The higher value (HHV), or gross heat of combustion, includes all the heat released as the products cool to room temperature and whatever water vapor is present condenses.
- The lower value (LHV), or net heat of combustion, does not include the heat which could be released by condensing water vapor, and may not include the heat released on cooling all the way down to room temperature.

A convenient table of HHV and LHV of some fuels can be found in the references.

=== In energy storage and fuels ===
Selected energy densities plot

For energy storage, the energy density relates the stored energy to the volume of the storage equipment, e.g. the fuel tank. The higher the energy density of the fuel, the more energy may be stored or transported for the same amount of volume. The energy of a fuel per unit mass is called its specific energy.

The adjacent figure shows the gravimetric and volumetric energy density of some fuels and storage technologies (modified from the Gasoline article). Some values may not be precise because of isomers or other irregularities. The heating values of the fuel describe their specific energies more comprehensively.

The density values for chemical fuels do not include the weight of the oxygen required for combustion. The atomic weights of carbon and oxygen are similar, while hydrogen is much lighter. Figures are presented in this way for those fuels where in practice air would only be drawn in locally to the burner. This explains the apparently lower energy density of materials that contain their own oxidizer (such as gunpowder and TNT), where the mass of the oxidizer in effect adds weight, and absorbs some of the energy of combustion to dissociate and liberate oxygen to continue the reaction. This also explains some apparent anomalies, such as the energy density of a sandwich appearing to be higher than that of a stick of dynamite.

Given the high energy density of gasoline, the exploration of alternative media to store the energy of powering a car, such as hydrogen or battery, is strongly limited by the energy density of the alternative medium. The same mass of lithium-ion storage, for example, would result in a car with only 2% the range of its gasoline counterpart. If sacrificing the range is undesirable, much more storage volume is necessary. Alternative options are discussed for energy storage to increase energy density and decrease charging time, such as supercapacitors.

No single energy storage method boasts the best in specific power, specific energy, and energy density. Peukert's law describes how the amount of useful energy that can be obtained (for a lead-acid cell) depends on how quickly it is pulled out.

=== Efficiency ===
In general an engine will generate less kinetic energy due to inefficiencies and thermodynamic considerations—hence the specific fuel consumption of an engine will always be greater than its rate of production of the kinetic energy of motion.

Energy density differs from energy conversion efficiency (net output per input) or embodied energy (the energy output costs to provide, as harvesting, refining, distributing, and dealing with pollution all use energy). Large scale, intensive energy use impacts and is impacted by climate, waste storage, and environmental consequences.

== Nuclear energy ==
The greatest energy source by far is matter itself, according to the mass–energy equivalence. This energy is described by E = mc^{2}, where c is the speed of light. In terms of density, m = ρV, where ρ is the volumetric mass density, V is the volume occupied by the mass. This energy can be released by the processes of nuclear fission (~ 0.1%), nuclear fusion (~ 1%), or the annihilation of some or all of the matter in the volume V by matter–antimatter collisions (100%).

The most effective ways of accessing this energy, aside from antimatter, are fusion and fission. Fusion is the process by which the sun produces energy which will be available for billions of years (in the form of sunlight and heat). However, as of 2026, sustained fusion power production continues to be elusive. Power from fission in nuclear power plants (using uranium and thorium) will be available for at least many decades or even centuries because of the plentiful supply of the elements on earth, though the full potential of this source can only be realized through breeder reactors, which are, apart from the BN-600 and BN-800 reactors, not yet used commercially.

=== Fission reactors ===
Nuclear fuels typically have volumetric energy densities at least tens of thousands of times higher than chemical fuels. A 1 inch tall uranium fuel pellet is equivalent to about 1 ton of coal, 120 gallons of crude oil, or 17,000 cubic feet of natural gas. In light-water reactors, 1 kg of natural uranium—following a corresponding enrichment and used for power generation—is equivalent to the energy content of nearly 10,000 kg of mineral oil or 14,000 kg of coal. Comparatively, coal, gas, and petroleum are the current primary energy sources in the U.S. but have a much lower energy density.

The density of thermal energy contained in the core of a light-water reactor (pressurized water reactor (PWR) or boiling water reactor (BWR)) of typically 1 GW (1000 MW electrical corresponding to ≈ 3000 MW thermal) is in the range of 10 to 100 MW of thermal energy per cubic meter of cooling water depending on the location considered in the system (the core itself (≈ 30 m^{3}), the reactor pressure vessel (≈ 50 m^{3}), or the whole primary circuit (≈ 300 m^{3})). This represents a considerable density of energy that requires a continuous water flow at high velocity at all times in order to remove heat from the core, even after an emergency shutdown of the reactor.

The incapacity to cool the cores of three BWRs at Fukushima after the 2011 tsunami and the resulting loss of external electrical power and cold source caused the meltdown of the three cores in only a few hours, even though the three reactors were correctly shut down just after the Tōhoku earthquake. This extremely high power density distinguishes nuclear power plants (NPP's) from any thermal power plants (burning coal, fuel or gas) or any chemical plants and explains the large redundancy required to permanently control the neutron reactivity and to remove the residual heat from the core of NPP's.

=== Antimatter–matter annihilation ===
Because antimatter–matter interactions result in complete conversion of the rest mass to radiant energy, the energy density of this reaction depends on the density of the matter and antimatter used. A neutron star would approximate the most dense system capable of matter-antimatter annihilation. A black hole, although denser than a neutron star, does not have an equivalent anti-particle form, but would offer the same 100% conversion rate of mass to energy in the form of Hawking radiation. Even in the case of relatively small black holes (smaller than astronomical objects) the power output would be tremendous.

== Electric and magnetic fields ==
Electric and magnetic fields can store energy and its density relates to the strength of the fields within a given volume. This (volumetric) energy density is given by
$$u = \frac{\varepsilon}{2} \mathbf{E}^2 + \frac{1}{2 \mu} \mathbf{B}^2$$
where E is the electric field, B is the magnetic field, and ε and µ are the permittivity and permeability of the surroundings respectively. The SI unit is the joule per cubic metre.

In ideal (linear and nondispersive) substances, the energy density is
$$u = \frac{1}{2} ( \mathbf{E} \cdot \mathbf{D} + \mathbf{H} \cdot \mathbf{B} )$$
where D is the electric displacement field and H is the magnetizing field. In the case of absence of magnetic fields, by exploiting Fröhlich's relationships it is also possible to extend these equations to anisotropic and nonlinear dielectrics, as well as to calculate the correlated Helmholtz free energy and entropy densities.

In the context of magnetohydrodynamics, the physics of conductive fluids, the magnetic energy density behaves like an additional pressure that adds to the gas pressure of a plasma.

=== Pulsed sources ===
When a pulsed laser impacts a surface, the radiant exposure, i.e. the energy deposited per unit of surface, may also be called energy density or fluence.

== Table of material energy densities ==
The following unit conversions may be helpful when considering the data in the tables: 3.6 MJ = 1 kW⋅h ≈ 1.34 hp⋅h. Since 1 J = 10^{−6} MJ and 1 m^{3} = 10^{3} L, divide joule/m^{3} by 10^{9} to get MJ/L = GJ/m^{3}. Divide MJ/L by 3.6 to get kW⋅h/L.

=== Chemical reactions (oxidation) ===
Unless otherwise stated, the values in the following table are lower heating values for perfect combustion, not counting oxidizer mass or volume. When used to produce electricity in a fuel cell or to do work, it is the Gibbs free energy of reaction (ΔG) that sets the theoretical upper limit. If the produced H_{2}O is vapor, this is generally greater than the lower heat of combustion, whereas if the produced H_{2}O is liquid, it is generally less than the higher heat of combustion. But in the most relevant case of hydrogen, ΔG is 113 MJ/kg if water vapor is produced, and 118 MJ/kg if liquid water is produced, both being less than the lower heat of combustion (120 MJ/kg).

Energy released by chemical reactions (oxidation)
Material	Specific energy (MJ/kg)	Energy density (MJ/L)	Specific energy (W⋅h/kg)	Energy density (W⋅h/L)	Comment
Hydrogen, liquid	141.86 (HHV); 119.93 (LHV)	10.044 (HHV); 8.491 (LHV)	39405.6 (HHV); 33,313.9 (LHV)	2790.0 (HHV); 2,358.6 (LHV)	Energy figures apply after reheating to 25 °C. See note above about use in fuel cells.
Hydrogen, gas (681 atm, 69 MPa, 25 °C)	141.86 (HHV); 119.93 (LHV)	5.323 (HHV); 4.500 (LHV)	39405.6 (HHV); 33313.9 (LHV)	1478.6 (HHV); 1250.0 (LHV)	Data from same reference as for liquid hydrogen. High-pressure tanks weigh much more than the hydrogen they can hold. The hydrogen may be around 5.7% of the total mass, giving just 6.8 MJ per kg total mass for the LHV. See note above about use in fuel cells.
Hydrogen, gas (1 atm or 101.3 kPa, 25 °C)	141.86 (HHV); 119.93 (LHV)	0.01188 (HHV); 0.01005 (LHV)	39405.6 (HHV); 33313.9 (LHV)	3.3 (HHV); 2.8 (LHV)	
Diborane	78.2		21722.2	24600.0	
Beryllium	67.6	125.1	18777.8	34750.0	
Lithium borohydride	65.2	43.4	18111.1	12055.6	
Boron	58.9	137.8	16361.1	38277.8	
Methane (101.3 kPa, 15 °C)	55.6	0.0378	15444.5	10.5	
LNG (NG at −160 °C)	53.6	22.2	14888.9	6166.7	
CNG (NG compressed to 247 atm, 25 MPa ≈ 3,600 psi)	53.6	9	14888.9	2500.0	
Natural gas	53.6	0.0364	14888.9	10.1	
LPG propane	49.6	25.3	13777.8	7027.8	
LPG butane	49.1	27.7	13638.9	7694.5	
Petrol (Gasoline)	46.4	34.2	12888.9	9500.0	
Polypropylene plastic	46.4	41.7	12888.9	11583.3	
Polyethylene plastic	46.3	42.6	12861.1	11833.3	
Residential heating oil	46.2	37.3	12833.3	10361.1	
Diesel fuel	45.6	38.6	12666.7	10722.2	
100LL Avgas	44.0	31.59	12222.2	8775.0	
Jet fuel (e.g. kerosene)	43	35	11944.4	9722.2	aircraft engine
Gasohol E10 (10% ethanol, 90% gasoline by volume)	43.54	33.18	12094.5	9216.7	
Lithium	43.1	23.0	11972.2	6388.9	
Biodiesel oil (vegetable oil)	42.20	33	11,722.2	9,166.7	
DMF (2,5-dimethylfuran)	42	37.8	11,666.7	10,500.0	
Paraffin wax	42	37.8	11700	10500	
Crude oil (tonne of oil equivalent)	41.868	37	11630	10278	
Polystyrene plastic	41.4	43.5	11500.0	12083.3	
Body fat	38	35	10555.6	9722.2	metabolism in human body (22% efficiency)
Butanol	36.6	29.2	10166.7	8111.1	
Gasohol E85 (85% ethanol 15% gasoline by volume)	33.1	25.65	9194.5	7125.0	
Graphite	32.7	72.9	9083.3	20250.0	
Coal, anthracite	26–33	34–43	7222.2–9166.7	9444.5–11944.5	Figures represent perfect combustion not counting oxidizer
Silicon	32.6	75.9	9,056	21,080	See Table 1
Aluminium	31.0	83.8	8611.1	23277.8	
Ethanol	30	24	8333.3	6666.7	
DME	31.7 (HHV); 28.4 (LHV)	21.24 (HHV); 19.03 (LHV)	8805.6 (HHV); 7888.9 (LHV)	5900.0 (HHV); 5286.1 (LHV)	
Polyester plastic	26.0	35.6	7222.2	9888.9	
Magnesium	24.7	43.0	6861.1	11,944.5	
Phosphorus (white)	24.30	44.30	6750	12310	
Coal, bituminous	24–35	26–49	6666.7–9722.2	7222.2–13611.1	
PET plastic (impure)	23.5	< ~32.4	6527.8	< ~9000	
Methanol	19.7	15.6	5472.2	4333.3	
Titanium	19.74	88.93	5480	24700	burned to titanium dioxide
Hydrazine	19.5	19.3	5416.7	5361.1	burned to nitrogen and water
Liquid ammonia	18.6	11.5	5166.7	3194.5	burned to nitrogen and water
Potassium	18.6	16.5	5160	4600	burned to dry potassium oxide
PVC plastic (improper combustion toxic)	18.0	25.2	5000.0	7000.0	
Wood	18.0		5000.0		
Peat briquette	17.7		4916.7		
Sugars, carbohydrates, and protein	17	26.2 (dextrose)	4722.2	7277.8	metabolism in human body (22% efficiency)
Calcium	15.9	24.6	4416.7	6833.3	
Glucose	15.55	23.9	4319.5	6638.9	
Dry cow dung and camel dung	15.5		4305.6		
Coal, lignite	10–20		2777.8–5555.6		
Sodium	13.3	12.8	3694.5	3555.6	burned to wet sodium hydroxide
Peat	12.8		3,555.6		
Nitromethane	11.3	12.85	3138.9	3570	
Manganese	9.46	68.2	2630	18900	burned to manganese dioxide
Sulfur	9.23	19.11	2563.9	5308.3	burned to sulfur dioxide
Sodium	9.1	8.8	2527.8	2444.5	burned to dry sodium oxide
Household waste	8.0		2222.2		
Iron	7.4	57.7	2052.9	16004.1	burned to iron(III) oxide
Iron	6.7	52.2	1858.3	14487.2	burned to Iron(II,III) oxide
Zinc	5.3	38.0	1472.2	10555.6	
Teflon plastic	5.1	11.2	1416.7	3111.1	combustion toxic, but flame retardant
Iron	4.9	38.2	1361.1	10611.1	burned to iron(II) oxide
Gunpowder	4.7–11.3	5.9–12.9		1600–3580	
TNT	4.184	6.92	1162	1920	
Barium	3.99	14.0	1110	3890	burned to barium dioxide
ANFO	3.7		1027.8		

=== Electrochemical reactions (batteries) ===
Energy released by electrochemical reactions or similar means
Material	Specific energy (MJ/kg)	Energy density (MJ/L)	Specific energy (W⋅h/kg)	Energy density (W⋅h/L)	Comment
Zinc-air battery	1.59	6.02	441.7	1672.2	controlled electric discharge
Lithium air battery (rechargeable)	9.0		2,500.0		controlled electric discharge
Sodium sulfur battery	0.54–0.86		150–240		
Lithium metal battery	1.8	4.32	500	1200	controlled electric discharge
Lithium-ion battery	0.36–0.875	0.9–2.63	100.00–243.06	250.00–730.56	controlled electric discharge
Lithium-ion battery with silicon nanowire anodes	1.566	4.32	435	1,200	controlled electric discharge
Alkaline battery	0.48	1.3	133	361	controlled electric discharge
Nickel-metal hydride battery	0.41	0.504–1.46			controlled electric discharge
Lead-acid battery	0.17	0.56	47.2	156	controlled electric discharge
Supercapacitor (EDLC)	0.01–0.030	0.006–0.06	up to 8.57		controlled electric discharge
Electrolytic capacitor	0.00001–0.0002	0.00001–0.001			controlled electric discharge

==== Common battery formats ====
Battery energy capacities
Storage device	Energy content (J)	Energy content (W⋅h)	Typical mass (g)	Typical dimensions (diameter × height in mm)	Typical volume (mL)	Specific energy (MJ/kg)	Energy density (MJ/L)
Alkaline AA battery	9360	2.6	24	14.2 × 50	7.92	0.39	1.18
Alkaline C battery	34416	9.5	65	26 × 46	24.42	0.53	1.41
NiMH AA battery	9072	2.5	26	14.2 × 50	7.92	0.35	1.15
NiMH C battery	19440	5.4	82	26 × 46	24.42	0.24	0.80
Lithium-ion 18650 battery	28800–46800	8–13	44–49	18 × 65	16.54	0.59–1.06	1.74–2.83

=== Nuclear reactions ===
Energy released by nuclear reactions
Material	Specific energy (MJ/kg)	Energy density (MJ/L)	Specific energy (W⋅h/kg)	Energy density (W⋅h/L)	Comment
Antimatter	89875517874 ≈ 90 PJ/kg	Depends on the density of the antimatter's form	24965421631578 ≈ 25 TW⋅h/kg	Depends on the density of the antimatter's form	Annihilation, counting both the consumed antimatter mass and ordinary matter mass
Hydrogen (fusion)	639780320 but at least 2% of this is lost to neutrinos.	Depends on conditions	177716755600	Depends on conditions	Reaction 4H→^{4}He
Deuterium (fusion)	571,182,758	Depends on conditions	158661876600	Depends on conditions	Proposed fusion scheme for D+D→^{4}He, by combining D+D→T+H, T+D→^{4}He+n, n+H→D and D+D→^{3}He+n, ^{3}He+D→^{4}He+H, n+H→D
Deuterium+tritium (fusion)	337387388	Depends on conditions	93718718800	Depends on conditions	D + T → ^{4}He + n Being developed.
Lithium-6 deuteride (fusion)	268848415	Depends on conditions	74680115100	Depends on conditions	^{6}LiD → 2^{4}He; Used in weapons.
Plutonium-239	83610000	1300000000–1,700,000,000 (depends on crystallographic phase)	23222915000	370000000000–460000000000 (depends on crystallographic phase)	Heat produced in Fission reactor
Plutonium-239	31,000,000	490000000–620000000 (Depends on crystallographic phase)	8700000000	140000000000–170000000000 (depends on crystallographic phase)	Electricity produced in Fission reactor
Uranium	80620000	1539842000	22394000000		Heat produced in breeder reactor
Thorium	79420000	929214000	22061000000		Heat produced in breeder reactor (experimental)
Plutonium-238 (alpha decay)	2239000	43277631	621900000		Radioisotope thermoelectric generator. The heat is only produced at a rate of 0.57 W/g.

=== In material deformation ===
The mechanical energy storage capacity, or resilience, of a Hookean material when it is deformed to the point of failure can be computed by calculating tensile strength times the maximum elongation dividing by two. The maximum elongation of a Hookean material can be computed by dividing stiffness of that material by its ultimate tensile strength. The following table lists these values computed using the Young's modulus as measure of stiffness:

Mechanical energy capacities
Material	Energy density by mass (J/kg)	Resilience: Energy density by volume (J/L)	Density (kg/L)	Young's modulus (GPa)	Tensile yield strength (MPa)
Rubber band	1651–6605	2200–8900	1.35		
Steel, ASTM A228 (yield, 1 mm diameter)	1440–1770	11200–13800	7.80	210	2170–2410
Acetals	908	754	0.831	2.8	65 (ultimate)
Nylon-6	233–1,870	253–2,030	1.084	2–4	45–90 (ultimate)
Copper beryllium 25-1/2 HT (yield)	684	5720	8.36	131	1224
Polycarbonates	433–615	520–740	1.2	2.6	52–62 (ultimate)
ABS plastics	241–534	258–571	1.07	1.4–3.1	40 (ultimate)
Acrylic		1530		3.2	70 (ultimate)
Aluminium 7077-T8 (yield)	399	1120	2.81	71.0	400
Steel, stainless, 301-H (yield)	301	2410	8.0	193	965
Aluminium 6061-T6 (yield @ 24 °C)	205	553	2.70	68.9	276
Epoxy resins		113–1810		2–3	26–85 (ultimate)
Douglas fir wood	158–200	96	0.481–0.609	13	50 (compression)
Steel, mild AISI 1018	42.4	334	7.87	205	370 (440 Ultimate)
Aluminium (not alloyed)	32.5	87.7	2.70	69	110 (ultimate)
Pine (American Eastern White, flexural)	31.8–32.8	11.1–11.5	0.350	8.30–8.56 (flexural)	41.4 (flexural)
Brass	28.6–36.5	250–306	8.4–8.73	102–125	250 (ultimate)
Copper	23.1	207	8.93	117	220 (ultimate)
Glass	5.56–10.0	13.9–25.0	2.5	50–90	50 (compression)

=== Other release mechanisms ===
Energy released by other means
Material	Specific energy (MJ/kg)	Energy density (MJ/L)	Specific energy (W⋅h/kg)	Energy density (W⋅h/L)	Comment
Silicon (phase change)	1.790	4.5	500	1,285	Energy stored through solid to liquid phase change of silicon
Strontium bromide hydrate	0.814	1.93		628	Thermal energy of phase change at 88.6 °C (361.8 K)
Liquid nitrogen	0.77	0.62	213.9	172.2	Maximum reversible work at 77.4 K with 300 K reservoir
Compressed air at 30 MPa (4,400 psi)	0.5	0.2	138.9	55.6	Potential energy
Latent heat of fusion of ice (thermal)	0.334	0.334	93.1	93.1	
Flywheel	0.36–0.5	5.3			Kinetic energy
Water at 100 m dam height	0.000981	0.000978	0.272	0.272	Figures represent potential energy, but efficiency of conversion to electricity is 85–90%

== See also ==
- Energy content of biofuel
- Energy density extended reference table
- Figure of merit
- Food energy
- Heat of combustion
- High-energy-density matter
- Power density and specifically power-to-weight ratio
- Rechargeable battery
- Solid-state battery
- Specific energy
- Specific impulse
- Orders of magnitude (energy)
