= Rachid Yazami =

Moroccan scientist (born 1953)

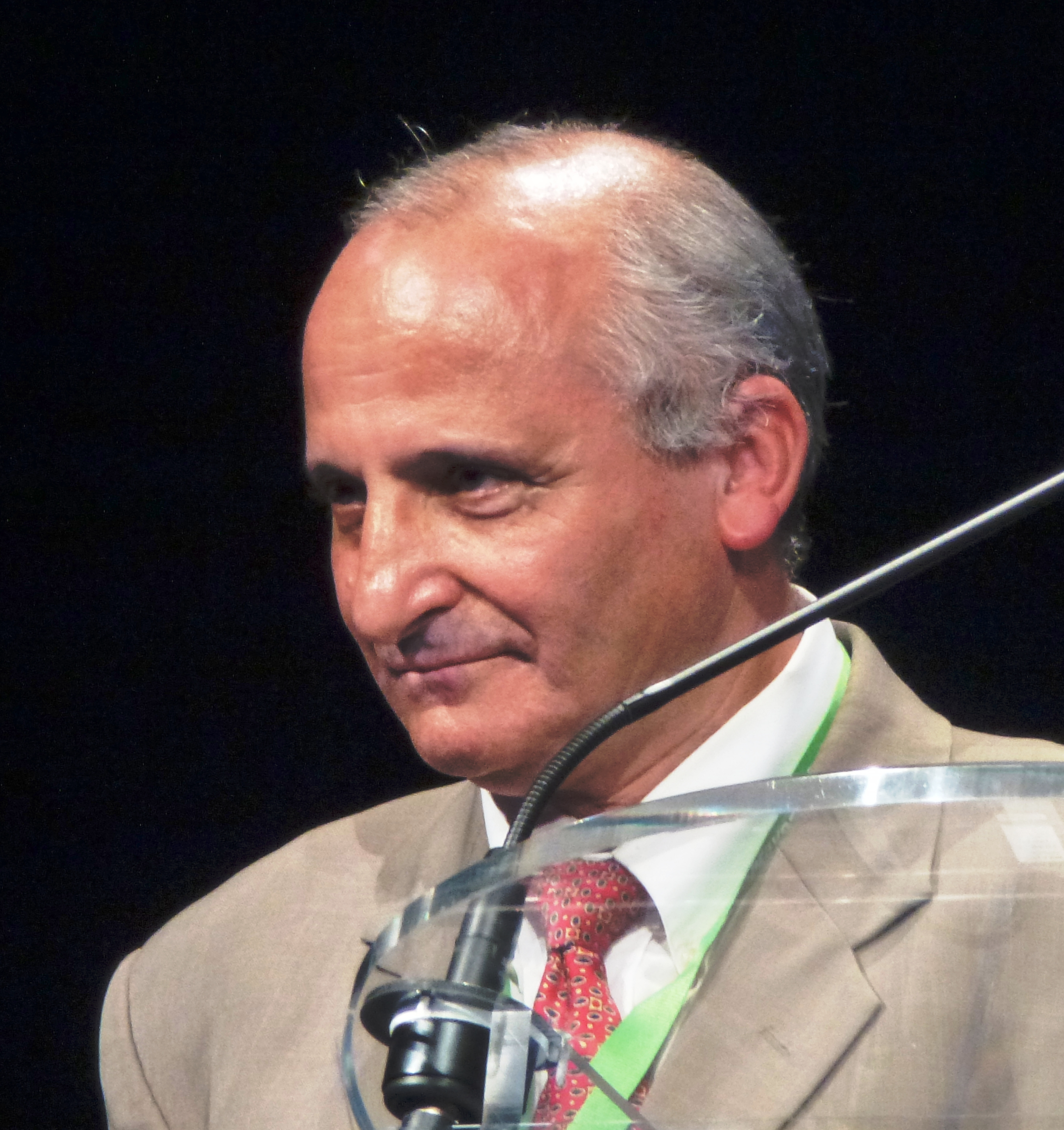
- Rachid Yazami in 2011
- Born: 16 April 1953 (age 73); Fez, Morocco
- Education: Grenoble Institute of Technology
- Known for: graphite anode in lithium-ion batteries, graphite cathode in fluoride ion batteries
- Awards: IEEE Medal for Environmental and Safety Technologies 2012, Draper Prize 2014, Royal Medal (Morocco) 2014, Legion of honour 2016, Takreem Award for Scientific Innovation and Technology (Kuwait City, 2018), Arab Investor Forum Award in Green Applications (UNESCO, Paris, 2019), The Mohammed bin Rashid Medal for Scientific Excellence and for Life Achievement (Dubai, 2020), The VinFuture Grand Prize (Hanoi, 2023)

Rachid Yazami (Arabic: رشيد اليزمي ; born 1953) is a Moroccan scientist, engineer, and inventor. He is best known for his critical role in the development of the graphite anode (negative pole) for lithium-ion batteries and his research on fluoride ion batteries.

== Education ==
Yazami graduated from the Grenoble Institute of Technology in 1978. He also received a PhD degree in 1985.

== Battery research ==
Yazami's research project included a study of graphite intercalation compounds for lithium battery applications. In 1985, he joined the French National Centre for Scientific Research (CNRS) as a research associate. He was later promoted to the position of research director and professor in 1998.

In 1980, Yazami was the first scientist to establish the reversible intercalation of lithium into graphite in an electrochemical cell using a polymer electrolyte. Eventually, his discovery led to the lithium-graphite anode which is now used in commercial lithium-ion batteries, a product with over $80 billion in market value. Yazami also worked on other forms of graphite materials for cathode applications in lithium batteries, including graphite oxide and graphite fluoride. In 2007, he founded a start-up company in California to develop and commercialize his patented discoveries, particularly on fluoride ion batteries (FIBs).

While holding a research director position with the CNRS in France, Yazami served as a visiting associate at the California Institute of Technology between 2000 and 2010. There, he conducted cooperative research on electrode materials, including nanostructured materials like carbon nanotubes, nano-silicon, and nano-germanium anodes. His research on cathode materials included thermodynamics studies of phase transitions in lithiated transition metal oxides and phosphates. He also developed a new electrochemical technique based on thermodynamics measurements (ETM), which can be applied to assessing a battery's state of charge, state of health, and state of safety. Entropymetery applications include battery life extension owing to adaptive (smart) battery charging protocols and battery safety enhancement.

In 2010, Yazami was appointed a Nanyang Visiting Professor. He was promoted in 2012 to the Cheng Tsang Man Chair Professor in Energy at the School of Materials Science and Engineering of the Nanyang Technological University (NTU) in Singapore. He served as the Director of Battery Programs at the Energy Research Institute (ERIAN) and as a Co-Principal Investigator in TUM Create Center of Electromobility lab. until 2017-18. While in Singapore, Yazami co-authored over 200 publications in peer-reviewed journals, in proceedings of international meetings, and as book chapters. He is the inventor involved in close to 180 patents according to the WIPO site.

From his recent experimental work, Yazami theorized that in a sealed rechargeable battery cell (closed system), such as a lithium-ion battery, two different states of charge of the battery cannot simultaneously share the same entropy and the same enthalpy values, a statement referred to as the "Yazami's Battery Theorem." The theorem can be expressed as:

(∆S(x_{1})=∆S(x_{2})) and (∆H(x_{1})=∆H(x_{2}))⇔ x_{1}=x_{2} , where x_{1}, x_{2} are two states of charge, ∆S= entropy, ∆H= enthalpy In fact, Yazami established a more universal (empirical) law that applies to primary and rechargeable batteries, that is the state of charge is a linear function of entropy and enthalpy. SOC=α+β∆S+γ∆H, in which α, β and γ coefficients depend on the cell' chemistry and state of health. This equation is reminiscent of Gibbs free energy. Yazami also developed a new method based on entropymetry to detect an early stage of an internal short circuit within a battery cell, therefore making batteries safer. An internal short is the main root cause of a battery undergoing a thermal runaway involving fume, fire and explosion. More recently, Yazami invented a new method enabling ultra-fast charging (UFC) lithium ion batteries in 10 minutes and below. The method was coined by him as "Non-linear voltammetry" (NLV). UFC is critical for rapid deployment of electric vehicles.

== Awards and writing ==
Yazami is the co-author involved in over 250 published papers and the co-inventor of about 160 patents related to lithium primary and rechargeable batteries and on new battery chemistry based on fluoride ion. He served as the President of the International Battery Association (IBA) and as a Member of the International Scientific Advisory Board of several international meetings, including the International Meetings on Lithium Batteries (IMLB). Yazami is the recipient of several research awards, including NATO (Science for Peace Award), NASA (two Technical Innovation Awards), IBA (Research Award), and the Hawaii Battery Conference. He is the main Founder of CFX Battery, Inc. (now Contour Energy Systems, Inc.) a Caltech-CNRS start-up company in Azusa, California and of KVI PTE LTD in Singapore. Yazami is the winner of 2012 Institute of Electrical and Electronics Engineers IEEE Medal for Environmental and Safety Technologies.

In 2014, Rachid Yazami, John Goodenough, Yoshio Nishi, and Akira Yoshino were awarded the Draper Prize by The National Academy of Engineering for pioneering and leading the groundwork for today’s lithium-ion battery. The prize, which was then in its 25th year, includes a $500,000 award. That same year, Yazami was a finalist of the Global Energy Award (Russia, 2014).

In September 2014, Rachid Yazami was appointed by HM the King of Morocco a Corresponding Member of the Hassan II Academy of Sciences and Technologies of Morocco.

Yazami received the Royal Medal (Wissam Malaki) of Intellectual Competency from HM the King of Morocco Mohamed VI, during Throne Day on 30 July 2014.

In March 2016, Rachid Yazami received an award as a finalist of the Marius Lavet Prize of Inventing-Engineers in Paris, France.

On 14 July 2016 Yazami was awarded the title of Chevalier de la Legion of honor of France.

In March 2017, he received the Honors Award of the Moroccans of the World.

In November 2018, Yazami was the recipient of the Takreem Award for Science and Technological Achievement considered as the Arab Scientist of the year.

In September 2019, Yazami received the Arab Investor Award in the “Green Application” category.

In February 2020, Yazami won the Mohammed bin Rashid Medal for Scientific Excellence in the UAE.

In 2020 Yazami was offered the position of visiting professor at the Private University of Fes (Morocco)

In 2021 Yazami was appointed a member of the New Energy Council of Reliance Industries Limited, India

In 2021 Yazami was appointed President of the Scientific Board of the Moroccan Institute of Advanced Studies.

In February 2022, Yazami was appointed a visiting scholar in chemistry at the California Institute of Technology.

In December 2023, Yazami was awarded the VinFuture Grand Prize in Hanoi, along with M. Stanley Whittingham, Martin Green, and Akira Yoshino.

=== Nobel Prize omission ===
In October 2019, his co-invention of the lithium-ion battery was honored with the 2019 Nobel Prize in Chemistry. However, Yazami himself was omitted from the award, which was instead given to Stanley Whittingham, John Goodenough, and Akira Yoshino. The Royal Swedish Academy of Sciences awarded Goodenough and Whittingham for their cathodes and Yoshino for the first working prototype but omitted the importance of the working graphite anode invented by Yazami. Due to the Nobel Prize's limitation of up to three recipients, Yazami believes the committee had to make a difficult decision between Whittingham and himself. He nevertheless congratulated the three recipients of the prize.
