= MJ/kg =

MJ/kg may refer to:

- megajoules per kilogram
- Specific kinetic energy
- Heat of fusion
- Heat of combustion
