= Bismuthate =

Ion

Bismuthate is an ion with the chemical formula BiO_{3}^{−} containing bismuth in its +5 oxidation state. It is a very strong oxidizing agent that decomposes in hot water, forming bismuth(III) oxide and oxygen. It also reacts with acids.

Sodium bismuthate is the most common bismuthate. It is one of the few sodium compounds that does not dissolve significantly in water.

== Related pages ==
- Bismuth(V) fluoride, a bismuth compound in its +5 oxidation state
- Lead bismuthate
- Sodium bismuthate
- Sodium bismuth titanate
