= Plutonium–gallium alloy =

Alloy used in nuclear weapon pits

Plutonium–gallium alloy (Pu–Ga) is an alloy of plutonium and gallium used in nuclear weapon pits, the component of a nuclear weapon where the fission chain reaction is started. This alloy was developed during the Manhattan Project.

== Overview ==
Metallic plutonium has several different solid allotropes. The δ phase is the least dense and most easily machinable. It is formed at temperatures of 310–452 °C at ambient pressure (1 atmosphere), and is thermodynamically unstable at lower temperatures. However, plutonium can be stabilized in the δ phase by alloying it with a small amount of another metal. The preferred alloy is 3.0–3.5 mol.% (0.8–1.0 wt.%) gallium.

Pu–Ga has many practical advantages:

- stable between −75 and 475 °C,
- very low thermal expansion,
- low susceptibility to corrosion (4% of the corrosion rate of pure plutonium),
- good castability; since plutonium has the rare property that the molten state is denser than the solid state, the tendency to form bubbles and internal defects is decreased.

== Use in nuclear weapons ==
Stabilized δ-phase Pu–Ga is ductile, and can be rolled into sheets and machined by conventional methods. It is suitable for shaping by hot pressing at about 400 °C. This method was used for forming the first nuclear weapon pits.

More modern pits are produced by casting. Subcritical testing showed that wrought and cast plutonium performance is the same. As only the ε-δ transition occurs during cooling, casting Pu-Ga is easier than casting pure plutonium.

δ phase Pu–Ga is still thermodynamically unstable, so there are concerns about its aging behavior. There are substantial differences of density (and therefore volume) between the various phases. The transition between δ-phase and α-phase plutonium occurs at a low temperature of 115 °C and can be reached by accident. Prevention of the phase transition and the associated mechanical deformations and consequent structural damage and/or loss of symmetry is of critical importance. Under 4 mol.% gallium the pressure-induced phase change is irreversible.

However, the phase change is useful during the operation of a nuclear weapon. As the reaction starts, it generates enormous pressures, in the range of hundreds of gigapascals. Under these conditions, δ phase Pu–Ga transforms to α phase, which is 25% denser and thus more critical.

== Effect of gallium ==
Plutonium in its α phase has a low internal symmetry, caused by uneven bonding between the atoms, more resembling (and behaving like) a ceramic than a metal. Addition of gallium causes the bonds to become more even, increasing the stability of the δ phase. The α phase bonds are mediated by the 5f shell electrons, and can be disrupted by increased temperature or by presence of suitable atoms in the lattice which reduce the available number of 5f electrons and weaken their bonds. The alloy is denser in molten state than in solid state, which poses an advantage for casting as the tendency to form bubbles and internal defects is decreased.

Gallium tends to segregate in plutonium, causing "coring"—gallium-rich centers of grains and gallium-poor grain boundaries. To stabilize the lattice and reverse and prevent segregation of gallium, annealing is required at the temperature just below the δ–ε phase transition, so gallium atoms can diffuse through the grains and create homogeneous structure. The time to achieve homogenization of gallium increases with increasing grain size of the alloy and decreases with increasing temperature. The structure of stabilized plutonium at room temperature is the same as unstabilized at δ-phase temperature, with the difference of gallium atoms substituting plutonium in the fcc lattice.

The presence of gallium in plutonium signifies its origin from weapon plants or decommissioned nuclear weapons. The isotopic signature of plutonium then allows rough identification of its origin, manufacturing method, type of the reactor used in its production, and rough history of the irradiation, and matching to other samples, which is of importance in investigation of nuclear smuggling.

== Aging ==
There are several plutonium and gallium intermetallic compounds: PuGa, Pu_{3}Ga, and Pu_{6}Ga.

During aging of the stabilized δ alloy, gallium segregates from the lattice, forming regions of Pu_{3}Ga (ζ'-phase) within α phase, with the corresponding dimensional and density change and buildup of internal strains. The decay of plutonium however produces energetic particles (alpha particles and uranium-235 nuclei) that cause local disruption of the ζ' phase, and establishing a dynamic equilibrium with only a modest amount of ζ' phase present, which explains the alloy's unexpectedly slow, graceful aging. The alpha particles are trapped as interstitial helium atoms in the lattice, coalescing into tiny (about 1 nm diameter) helium-filled bubbles in the metal and causing negligible levels of void swelling; the size of bubbles appears to be limited, though their number increases with time.

Addition of 7.5 wt.% of plutonium-238, which has significantly faster decay rate, to the alloy increases the aging damage rate by 16 times, assisting with plutonium aging research. The Blue Gene supercomputer aided with simulations of plutonium aging processes.

== Production ==
Plutonium alloys can be produced by adding a metal to molten plutonium. However, if the alloying metal is sufficiently reductive, plutonium can be added in the form of oxides or halides. The δ phase plutonium–gallium and plutonium–aluminium alloys are produced by adding plutonium(III) fluoride to molten gallium or aluminium, which has the advantage of avoiding dealing directly with the highly reactive plutonium metal.

== Reprocessing into MOX fuel ==
For reprocessing of surplus warhead pits into MOX fuel, the majority of gallium has to be removed as its high content could interfere with the fuel rod cladding (gallium attacks zirconium) and with migration of fission products in the fuel pellets. In the ARIES process, the pits are converted to oxide by converting the material to plutonium hydride, then optionally to nitride, and then to oxide. Gallium is then mostly removed from the solid oxide mixture by heating at 1100 °C in a 94% argon 6% hydrogen atmosphere, reducing gallium content from 1% to 0.02%. Further dilution of plutonium oxide during the MOX fuel manufacture brings gallium content to levels considered negligible. A wet route of gallium removal, using ion exchange, is also possible. Electrorefining is another way to separate gallium and plutonium.

== Development history ==
During the Manhattan Project (1942–1945), the maximum amount of diluent atoms for plutonium to not affect the explosion efficiency was calculated to be 5 mol.%. Two stabilizing elements were considered, silicon and aluminium. However, only aluminium produced satisfactory alloys. But the aluminium tendency to react with α-particles and emit neutrons limited its maximum content to 0.5 mol.%; the next element from the boron group of elements, gallium, was tried and found to be satisfactory. The early atomic bomb design secrets passed to the Soviets by spy Klaus Fuchs included the gallium trick for stabilizing phases of plutonium, and thus the first Soviet atomic bomb used this alloy also.
