= Specific mechanical energy =

- Common symbols: e, or ε
- SI unit: J/kg, or m^{2}/s^{2}

Specific mechanical energy is the mechanical energy of an object per unit of mass. Similar to mechanical energy, the specific mechanical energy of an object in an isolated system subject only to conservative forces will remain constant.

It is defined as:

$\epsilon$= $\epsilon$_{k}+$\epsilon$_{p}

where

- $\epsilon$_{k} is the specific kinetic energy
- $\epsilon$_{p} it the specific potential energy

== Astrodynamics ==
In the gravitational two-body problem, the specific mechanical energy of one body $\epsilon$ is given as:

$$\begin{align}
\epsilon &= \frac{v^2}{2} - \frac{\mu}{r}
= -\frac{1}{2} \frac{\mu^2}{h^2} \left(1 - e^2\right)
= -\frac{\mu}{2a}
\end{align}$$

where

- $v\,\!$ is the orbital speed of the body; relative to center of mass.
- $r\,\!$ is the orbital distance between the body and center of mass;
- $\mu = {G}(m_1 + m_2)\,\!$ is the standard gravitational parameter of the bodies;
- $h\,\!$ is the specific relative angular momentum of the same body referenced to the center of mass. In other context h is used in the sense of a total for two bodies expressed as relative angular momentum of the system divided by the reduced mass, giving the same result for a central force problem;
- $e\,\!$ is the orbital eccentricity;
- $a\,\!$ is the semi-major axis of the body orbit.

The relations are used.

$p= \frac{h^2}{\mu}$ $= a(1-{e^2}$) $= r_{p}$$(1+e)$

where

- $p\,\!$ is the conic section semi-latus rectum.
- $r_p\,\!$ is distance at periastron of the body from the center of mass.

$v = \sqrt{\mu\left({2\over{r}} - {1\over{a}}\right)}$

where

- $\mu\,$ is the standard gravitational parameter, G(m_{1}+m_{2}), often expressed as GM when one body is much larger than the other.
- $r\,$ is the distance between the orbiting body and center of mass.
- $a\,\!$ is the length of the semi-major axis.

=== Orbital Mechanics ===
When calculating the specific mechanical energy of a satellite in orbit around a celestial body, the mass of the satellite is assumed to be negligible:

$\mu = G(M + m) \approx GM$

where $M$ is the mass of the celestial body. When GM is used the center of mass is at the center of M. When bodies cannot accurately be described as point masses in the equations, other math is required and a difference may be required between center of mass and center of gravity. In star systems of more than one planet, a planet orbit differs slightly from ideal with corrections applied for the other planets.
