= Molicel =

Taiwanese manufacturer of lithium-ion batteries

E-One Moli Energy
- Founded: 1998
- Headquarters: Taipei, Taiwan
- Website: www.molicel.com

E-One Moli Energy Corp. is a Taiwanese manufacturer of lithium-ion batteries. It was founded in 1998, and focused on producing high-capacity energy cells for notebook computers, high-end electronics, and networking communication devices under the "Molicel" brand.

In 2004, it partnered with Milwaukee Electric Tool to develop a high-energy power cell for cordless power tools, with its first power tool model introduced in 2005. It has also provided batteries to Ford for electric cars, and in 2008, became the first qualified battery supplier for BMW MINI E.

Its E-One Moli Energy (Canada) Limited division has a facility in Maple Ridge, British Columbia. On November 16, 2023, E-One Moli announced that it will be investing $796 million in a manufacturing plant in Western Canada that will make lithium cells, though this was suspended on November 22, 2024. The new plant is expected to create 450 high-skills jobs with production of the batteries expected to start in 2028.

== History ==
The history of E-One Moli Energy goes back to Moli Energy Ltd., the Canadian pioneer of rechargeable lithium battery technology, founded in 1977 in the Greater Vancouver suburb of Burnaby by the University of British Columbia and Teck Mining Corp., with Teck's then-chairman Dr. Norman Keevil Sr. as the lead investor. Moli Energy went into receivership after a cell-phone battery produced by the company caught fire in 1989, resulting in its sales being halted and tens of thousands of phones getting recalled. The failure of Moli's battery technology caused a shift towards safer intercalation electrode materials.

The company was then acquired by "a consortium of Japanese tech companies" for CA$5 million in a deal with the British Columbia government. The deal was criticized for being far below the value of Moli's patents. In 1994, the company became Nippon Moli Energy Corp., and in 1997, it became NEC Moli Energy Corp. In 1998, it merged with Taiwanese E-One Technology, forming the current E-One Moli Energy Corp.

On July 14, 2025, a fire broke out at a Molicel manufacturing plant in Kaohsiung, originating in a warehouse containing semi-complete batteries. 12 workers and 3 firefighters were injured. The incident cost Molicel an estimate of NT$5 billion ($154.5 million USD) in damages.
