= Lithium tetrachloroaluminate =

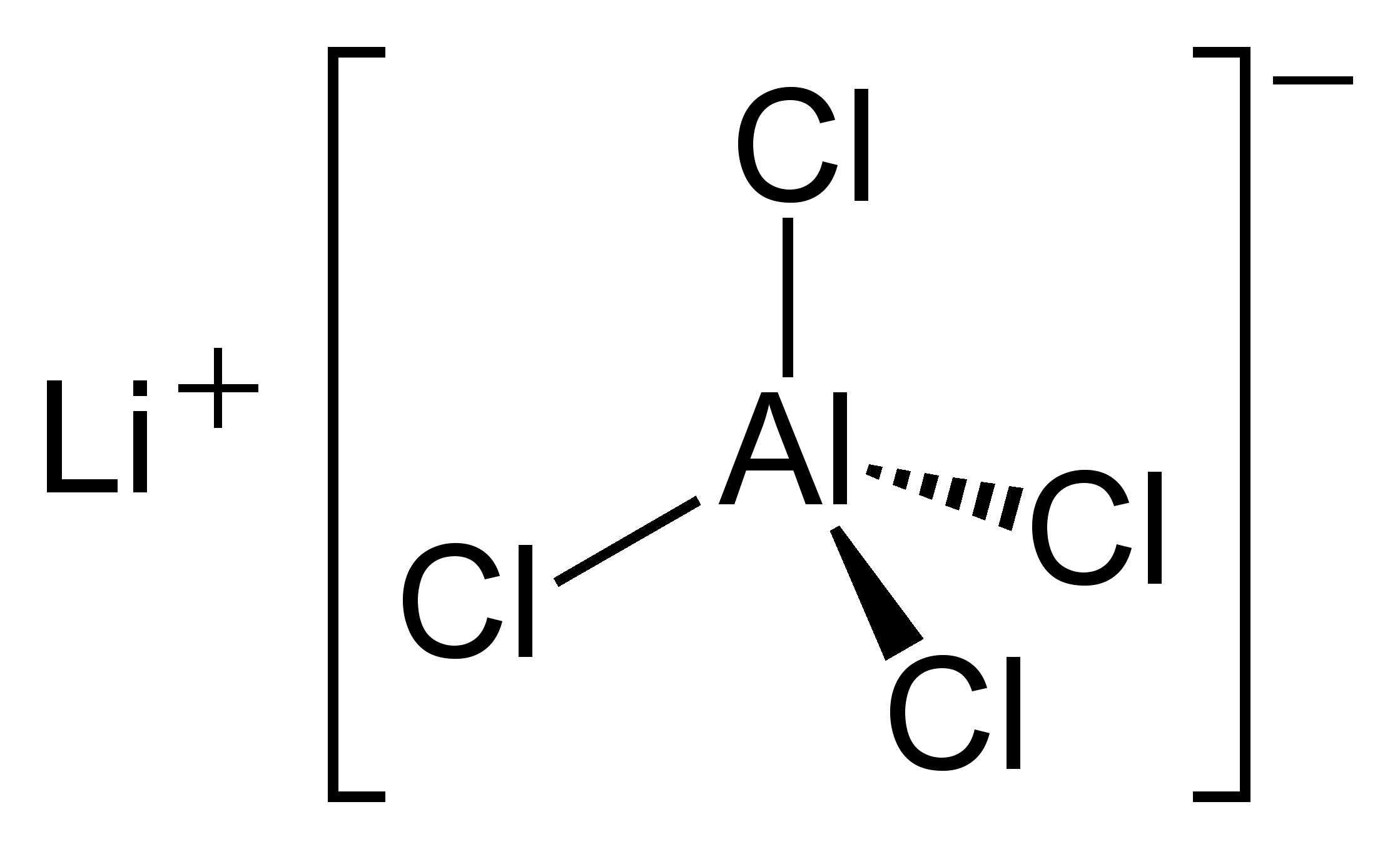

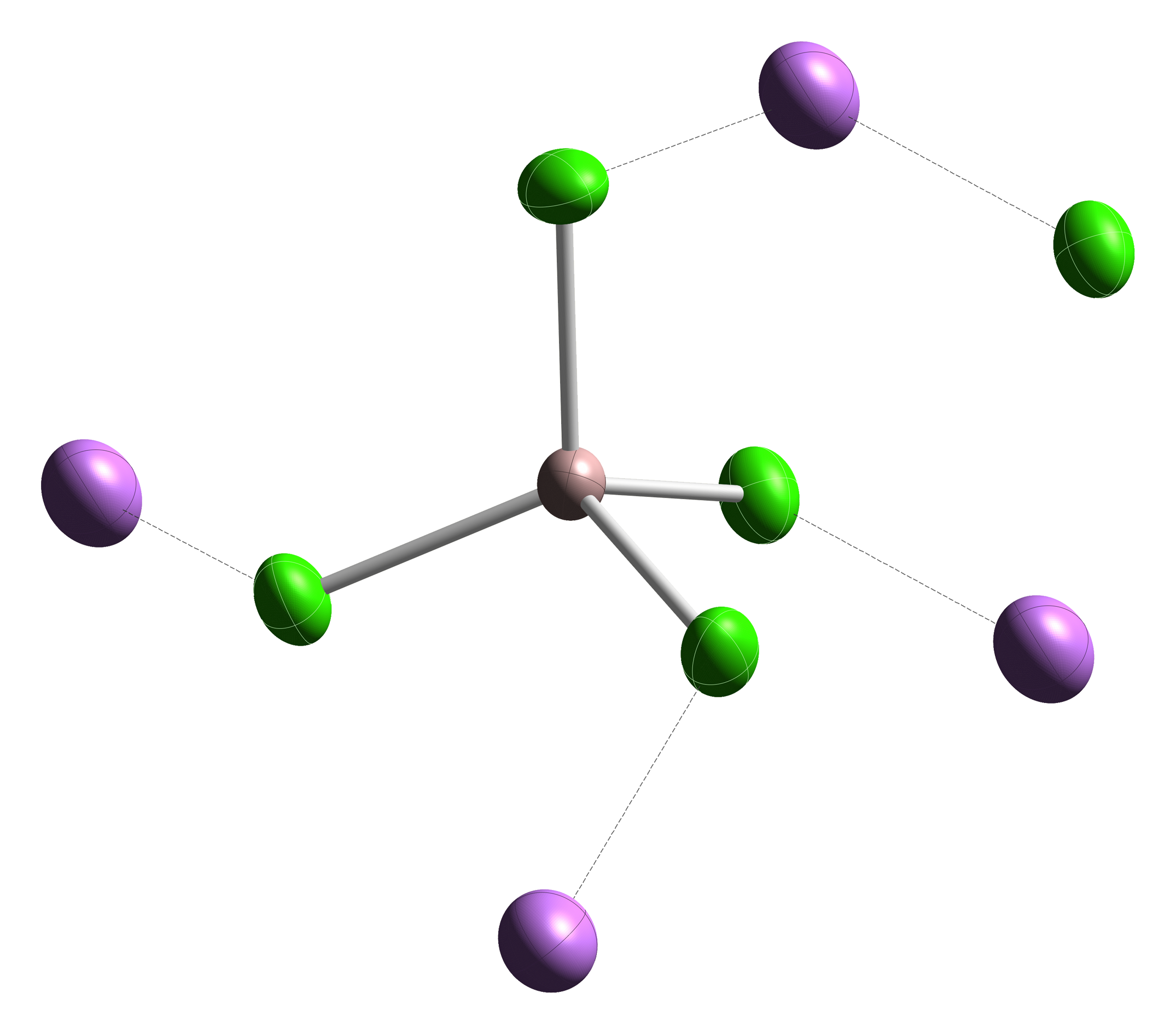

Names
- IUPAC name Lithium tetrachloroaluminate
- Other names LAC; Lithium aluminium chloride

Identifiers
CAS Number	14024-11-4
3D model (JSmol)	Interactive image
ChemSpider	21160220
ECHA InfoCard	100.034.396
EC Number	237-850-9
PubChem CID	16700422
CompTox Dashboard (EPA)	DTXSID50893949
- InChI: InChI=1S/Al.4ClH.Li/h;4*1H;/q+3;;;;;+1/p-4 Key: AQLRWYUVWAYZFO-UHFFFAOYSA-J; InChI=1/Al.4ClH.Li/h;4*1H;/q+3;;;;;+1/p-4/rAlCl4.Li/c2-1(3,4)5;/q-1;+1 Key: AQLRWYUVWAYZFO-VCMAQHAHAL
- SMILES: [Li+].Cl[Al-](Cl)(Cl)Cl

Properties
Chemical formula	Li[AlCl_{4}]
Molar mass	175.72 g·mol^{−1}
Appearance	White hygroscopic crystalline powder
Odor	Odorless
Melting point	143 °C (289 °F; 416 K)
Solubility in water	Soluble. Reacts violently with water.

Hazards
- GHS labelling
Pictograms	(GHS05: Corrosive) (GHS07: Exclamation mark)
Signal word	Danger
Hazard statements	H302, H312, H314, H332
Precautionary statements	P260, P264, P270, P271, P280, P301+P312, P301+P330+P331, P302+P352, P303+P361+P353, P304+P312, P304+P340, P305+P351+P338, P310, P312, P321, P322, P330, P363, P405, P501

Related compounds
Related salts	Sodium tetrachloroaluminate
- Except where otherwise noted, data are given for materials in their standard state (at 25 °C [77 °F], 100 kPa). verify (what is ?) Infobox references

Lithium tetrachloroaluminate is an inorganic compound with the formula Li[AlCl_{4}]. It consists of lithium cations Li^{+} and tetrahedral tetrachloroaluminate anions [AlCl_{4}]^{−}.

== Uses ==
Lithium tetrachloroaluminate is used in some lithium batteries. A solution of lithium tetrachloroaluminate in thionyl chloride is the liquid cathode and electrolyte in those baterries, e.g. the lithium-thionyl chloride cell. Another cathode-electrolyte formulation is lithium tetrachloroaluminate + thionyl chloride + sulfur dioxide + bromine.

== Reactions ==
Reacts violently with water, alcohols and oxidizing agents. Upon exposure to heat or fire, it decomposes emitting irritating and toxic fumes and smoke of hydrogen chloride, lithium oxide and aluminium oxide.

== Toxicity ==
Upon contact with skin, causes burns. Inhalation causes coughing and corrosive injuries to the respiratory system, which can lead to pneumonia. This compound is extremely destructive to the mucous tissues. May cause pulmonary edema and edema of the larynx, laryngitis and edema of bronchi, leading to shortness of breath. May cause damage to the eyes, headache and nausea. If swallowed, may cause damage.
