= Lithium hexafluoroarsenate =

Names
- IUPAC name lithium;hexafluoroarsenic(1-)
- Other names Hexafluoroarsenate(V) lithium

Identifiers
CAS Number	29935-35-1
3D model (JSmol)	Interactive image
ChemSpider	8012757
ECHA InfoCard	100.045.406
EC Number	249-963-0
PubChem CID	9837036
CompTox Dashboard (EPA)	DTXSID50885465
- InChI: InChI=1S/AsF6.Li/c2-1(3,4,5,6)7;/q-1;+1 Key: GTZQZEYBOGZTEO-UHFFFAOYSA-N
- SMILES: [Li+].F[As-](F)(F)(F)(F)F

Properties
Chemical formula	AsF_{6}Li
Molar mass	195.85 g·mol^{−1}
Appearance	powder
Density	g/cm^{3}
Melting point	349
Solubility in water	soluble

Hazards
- GHS labelling
Pictograms	(GHS06: Toxic) (GHS09: Environmental hazard)
Signal word	Danger
Hazard statements	H301, H331, H410
Precautionary statements	P261, P264, P271, P273, P301, P304, P310, P311, P340
- Except where otherwise noted, data are given for materials in their standard state (at 25 °C [77 °F], 100 kPa). Infobox references

Lithium hexafluoroarsenate is an inorganic chemical compound with the chemical formula LiAsF_{6}.

== Synthesis ==
Reaction of arsenic pentafluoride and lithium fluoride in liquid hydrogen fluoride:

LiF + AsF_{5} → LiAsF_{6}

== Physical properties ==
Lithium hexafluoroarsenate forms crystals. It is well-soluble both in water and organic solvents. It forms a crystallohydrate of the composition Li[AsF_{6}]•H_{2}O. Its crystals are of rhombic system.

== Chemical properties ==
Strong oxidizing and reducing agents as well as strong acids and bases cause violent reactions with lithium hexafluoroarsenate. The decomposition produces hydrogen fluoride, arsenic oxides, and lithium oxide.

== Uses ==
Lithium hexafluoroarsenate can be used in the fabrication of lithium-ion batteries.
