= Cerium fluoride =

Cerium fluoride may refer to:

- Cerium(III) fluoride (cerium trifluoride), CeF_{3}
- Cerium(IV) fluoride (cerium tetrafluoride), CeF_{4}
