= Allotropes of plutonium =

Six or seven different forms that pure plutonium metal can take

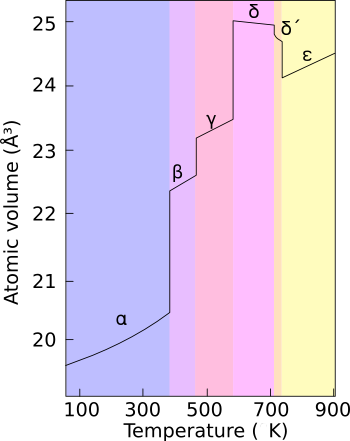
A diagram of the allotropes of plutonium at ambient pressure. Atomic volumes in cubic angstroms.: Phase / Crystal structure / Density (g/cm^{3}); alpha (α) / simple monoclinic / 19.86; beta (β) / body-centered monoclinic / 17.70; gamma (γ) / face-centered orthorhombic / 17.14; delta (δ) / face-centered cubic / 15.92; delta prime (δ′) / body-centered tetragonal / 16.00; epsilon (ε) / body-centered cubic / 16.51

Plutonium occurs in a variety of allotropes, even at ambient pressure. These allotropes differ widely in crystal structure and density; the α and δ allotropes differ in density by more than 25% at constant pressure.

== Overview ==
Plutonium normally has six allotropes and forms a seventh (zeta, ζ) under high temperature and a limited pressure range. The allotropes have very similar energy levels but significantly varying densities and crystal structures. This makes plutonium very sensitive to changes in temperature, pressure, or chemistry, and allows for dramatic volume changes following phase transitions. Densities of the different allotropes vary from 16.00 g/cm^{3} to 19.86 g/cm^{3}.

The reasons for the complicated phase diagram are not entirely understood, but thought to involve electron localization. f orbital electrons in early actinides (up to plutonium) are generally delocalized into the conduction band, similar to transition metal valence electrons. f electrons in late actinides (americium and beyond) are localized and nonbonding, similar to in the lanthanides. At plutonium, the transition between the delocalized and localized states is generally expected to require little energy due to electron correlation, an example of a quantum phase transition. The low-temperature α allotrope of plutonium is similar to early actinide phases and the higher-temperature δ allotrope resembles late actinide phases.

Recent research has focused on constructing accurate computer models of the phase transitions.

The many allotropes make machining plutonium very difficult, as it changes state very readily. Contrariwise in fission weapons, the explosive shock waves used to compress a plutonium core will also cause a transition from the usual δ phase plutonium to the denser α phase, significantly helping to achieve supercriticality.

== Descriptions ==
The alpha (α) phase exists in unalloyed plutonium at room temperature, and has a low-symmetry monoclinic structure, hence poor conductivity, brittleness, strength, and compressibility. It machines similar to cast iron. The material changes to the beta (β) phase at slightly higher temperatures. Neptunium is the only element known to stabilize the α phase at higher temperatures. Titanium, hafnium and zirconium stabilize the β phase at room temperature when rapidly cooled.

Plutonium in the delta (δ) phase resembles typical metals and is roughly as strong and malleable as aluminium. It is industrially desirable as it has relatively little thermal contraction and enhanced workability, allowing welding during weapons manufacture. The phase normally exists at 310–452 °C but is metastable at room temperature when alloyed with a small percentage of gallium, aluminium, or cerium; or large amounts of hafnium, holmium, or thallium. Silicon, indium, zinc and zirconium allow a metastable δ state when rapidly cooled. Plutonium–gallium alloy is the most common δ-stabilized alloy.

Unlike most materials, plutonium increases in density when it melts, by 2.5%, but the liquid metal exhibits a linear decrease in density with temperature.

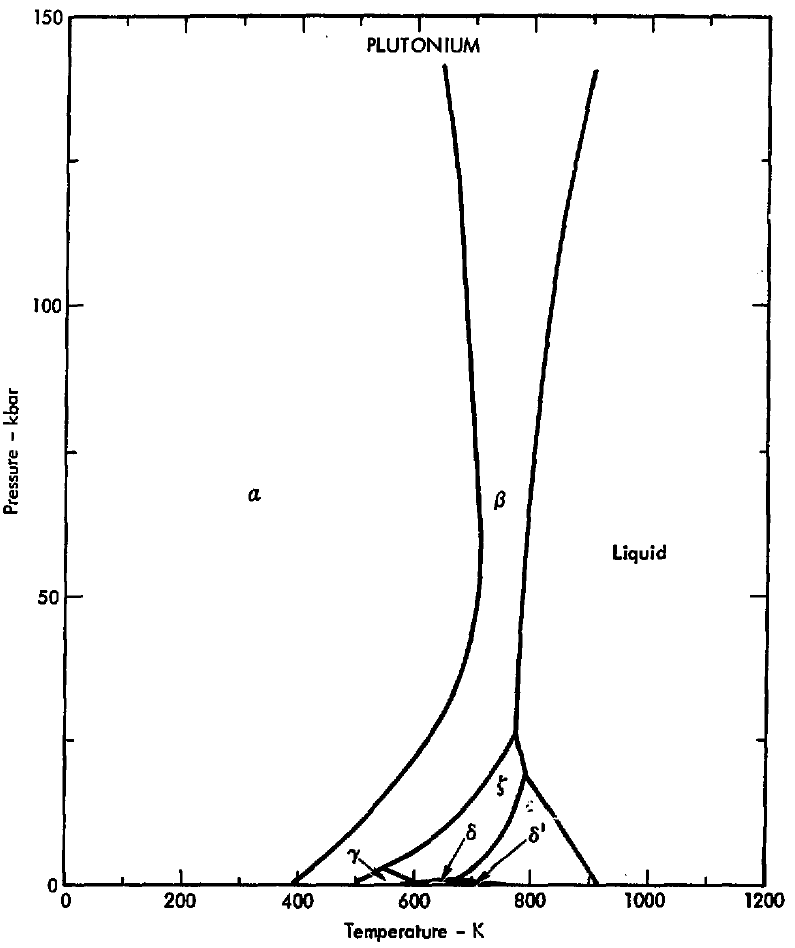
Phase diagram of plutonium (1975 data)

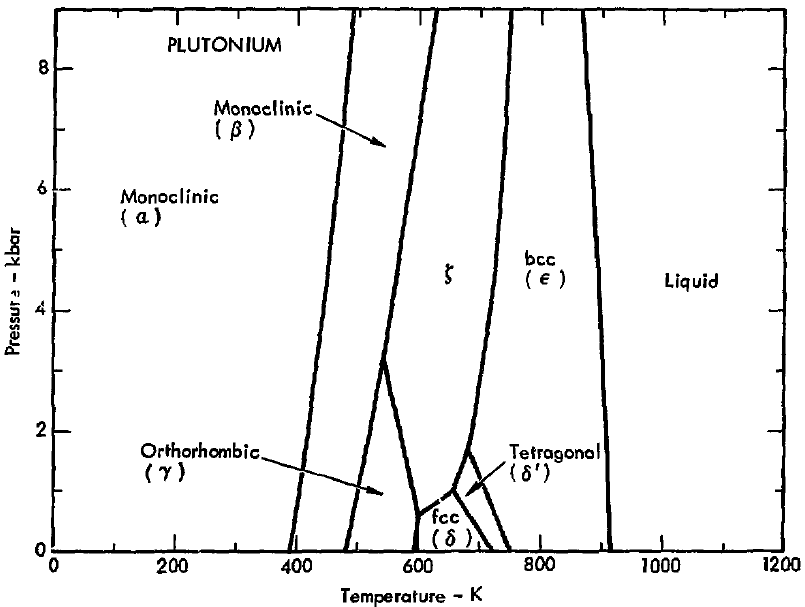
Phase diagram detail for lower pressures
