= Molecular spring =

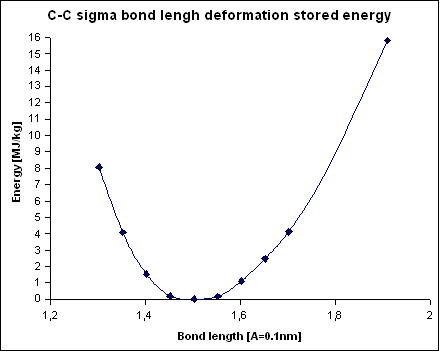
illustrative example of C-C length molecular energy dependence, numerical accuracy is not guaranteed

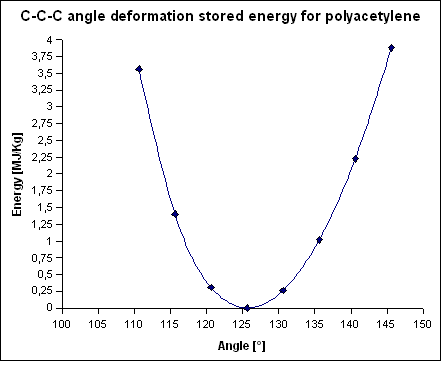
illustrative example of C-C-C angle molecular energy dependence, numerical accuracy is not guaranteed

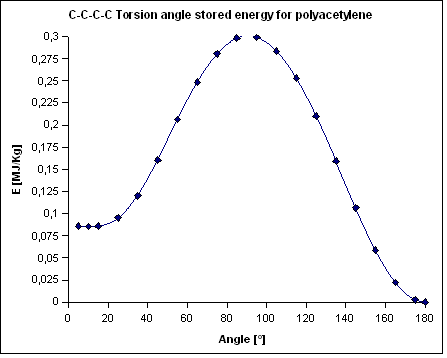
illustrative example of C-C-C-C torsion molecular energy dependence, numerical accuracy is not guaranteed

A Molecular spring is a device or part of a biological system based on molecular mechanics and is associated with molecular vibration.

Any molecule can be deformed in several ways - A-A bond length, A-A-A angle, A-A-A-A torsion angle. Deformed molecules store energy, which can be released and cause mechanical work as the molecules return into their optimal geometrical conformation.

The term molecular string is usually used in nano-science and molecular biology, however theoretically also macroscopic molecular springs can be considered, if it is manufactured. Such a device composed for example of arranged ultra-high molecular mass polymer fibres (Helicene, Polyacetylene) could store extraordinary (0.1-10MJ/kg in comparison to 0.0003MJ/kg of clockwork spring) amount of energy which can be stored and released almost instantly, with high energy conversion efficiency. The amount of energy storable in molecular spring is limited by the value of deformation the molecule can withstand until it undergoes chemical change. Manufacturing of such macroscopic device is however out of reach of contemporary technology, because of difficulties of synthesis and molecular arrangement of such long polymer molecules. In addition, the force needed to draw molecular string to its maximum length could be impractically high - comparable to the tensile strength of particular polymer molecule (~100GPa for some carbon compounds)

== See also ==
- Ultra high molecular weight polyethylene
- Carbon nanotube
- Carbon nanotube springs
