= Samarium fluoride =

Samarium fluoride may refer to:

- Samarium(III) fluoride (samarium trifluoride), SmF_{3}
- Samarium(II) fluoride (samarium difluoride), SmF_{2}
- Samarium(I) fluoride (samarium monofluoride), SmF known in gas form
