= Rechargeable lithium metal battery =

Type of battery

Rechargeable lithium metal batteries are secondary lithium metal batteries. They have metallic lithium as a negative electrode. The high specific capacity of lithium metal (3,860 mAh g^{−1}), very low redox potential (−3.040 V versus standard hydrogen electrode) and low density (0.59 g cm^{−3}) make it the ideal negative material for high energy density battery technologies. Rechargeable lithium metal batteries can have a long run time due to the high charge density of lithium. Several companies and many academic research groups are currently researching and developing rechargeable lithium metal batteries as they are considered a leading pathway for development beyond lithium-ion batteries. Some rechargeable lithium metal batteries employ a liquid electrolyte and some employ a solid-state electrolyte.

== History ==
A rechargeable lithium metal battery was commercialized by Moli Energy (now known as E-One Moli Energy) in the 1980s, but after several cells caught fire, devices using Moli batteries were recalled and the company went into receivership.

== Research directions ==
The primary challenges in developing practical rechargeable lithium metal batteries are low cell life due to low Coulombic efficiency, and poor reliability due to dendrite formation causing a short-circuit. Efforts to improve performance center around the choice of electrolyte, since the electrolyte reaction with lithium dictates Coulombic efficiency.

=== Dendrites ===
Dendrites are typically <1% of the size of a human hair. A 2026 study claimed that the reason that dendrites can cause shorts is that the solid electrolyte interphase forms around dendrites, stiffening them and allowing them to penetrate the electrolyte. Such dendrites are brittle, and can break away from the anode, becoming no longer available to carry charge.

=== Liquid electrolyte ===
Research directions include high salt systems, additives or fluorine-containing electrolytes that form solid-electrolyte interface (SEI) layers on lithium, and encapsulating lithium inside protective shells.

In 2023, solvent-free electrolytes based on low-melting molten salt mixtures were shown to have wide electrochemical window (5 V), good compatibility with Li metal anode, and negligible flammability/volatility. They represent a promising direction towards high-performance and safe rechargeable Li metal batteries.

=== Solid-state electrolyte ===
Solid polymer electrolytes such as poly-ethylene oxide (PEO) have been researched for decades but require high temperature, low voltage cathodes, and low current densities to reach reasonable cycle life and reliability. Inorganic-polymer composites have been studied to find a processable, flexible system. Many inorganic materials families have been studied, including LiPON, lithium borohydride, glassy, semi-crystalline, and crystalline sulfides, NASICON structured phosphates, perovskites, anti-perovskites, and garnets.

== Commercialization ==
Rechargeable lithium metal batteries have been commercialized by Bolloré in the Bluecar program, and thin film batteries with low energy content were sold by Cymbet and others. Several companies are developing rechargeable lithium metal batteries for applications in consumer electronics devices and electric vehicles. The status of the development efforts that have publicly announced data is summarized in the table below.

Lithium metal cell cycling data summary
Organization	Cell size	Current density	Cycles	Pressure	Mass loading	Temperature	Source
Ion Storage Systems	1 layer coin cell	0.2 mA/cm^{2}	25	?	2.5 mAh/cm^{2}	25	
PolyPlus	1 layer coin cell	0.4 mA/cm^{2}	50	?	2.6 mAh/cm^{2}	?	
Samsung	600 mAh 2 layer	3.4 mA/cm^{2}	1000	20 atm	6.8 mAh/cm^{2}	60 °C	
Sion	1.8 Ah	C/1.5	700	?	?	?	
QuantumScape	70 mm × 85 mm 10-layer	3.2 mA/cm^{2}	800	3.4 atm	3.2 mAh/cm^{2}	29 °C	

== Characteristics ==
Although this type of battery has been available as small coin batteries since the 2000s, attempts to produce larger versions capable of providing large amounts of power have, so far, proved unsuccessful. Lithium metal batteries have very different characteristics to the more common lithium-ion batteries.

Their terminal voltage is lower than lithium ion ranging from 3.1 volts when fully charged to 1.0 volts at full discharge. Unlike lithium ion, the terminal voltage does not steadily fall as discharge proceeds. The voltage falls from 3.1 volts to 2.5 within approximately the first 10% of discharge. From here the terminal voltage remains relatively constant at 2.5 volts until about 10% of the useable charge remains. From here it falls to 1.0 volt at which the battery should not be discharged further as permanent damage will result.

The biggest disadvantage of the current lithium metal battery (as of 2024) is that the maximum discharge current is a paltry 0.2% of the capacity. That is for a 5 mAh battery (a typical current size), the maximum discharge current is just 10 μA.

The battery's charging requirements are also very different to the lithium ion type. Just as the maximum discharge current is very low, so is the maximum charge current. The only recommended method is to charge the battery from a voltage supply of exactly 3.1 volts through a current limiting resistor. The resistor value is found by dividing 5 by the mAh capacity of the battery. The downside is that battery must charge over a 30 hour period.

The discharge and charge characteristics dictate that this type of battery is only suitable for applications such as memory backup power or powering a real time clock chip in (say) a camera.

The battery has a temperature characteristic very different to lithium-ion batteries. The official temperature range is -20 to 60 °C. Compared with 20 °C, the battery undergoes about a 15% reduction in available capacity at -20 °C which is not that unusual. However: at 60 °C, the battery exhibits an additional 5–10% capacity.

One big advantage is that the self discharge rate of this battery type is the lowest of any existing rechargeable battery technology. so low, in fact, that the batteries have a shelf life of greater than 10 years.

== See also ==
- List of battery types
- Lithium battery
- Non-rechargeable lithium metal battery
