= Resilience (materials science) =

Material ability to absorb energy when deformed elastically

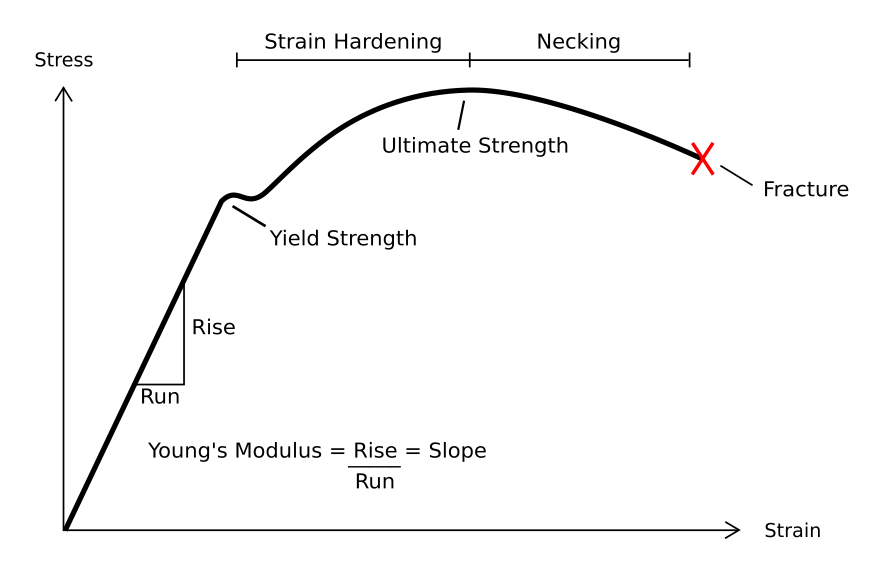
The area under the linear portion of a stress–strain curve is the resilience of the material.

In material science, resilience is the ability of a material to absorb energy when it is deformed elastically, and release that energy upon unloading. Proof resilience is defined as the maximum energy that can be absorbed up to the elastic limit, without creating a permanent distortion. The modulus of resilience is defined as the maximum energy that can be absorbed per unit volume without creating a permanent distortion. It can be calculated by integrating the stress–strain curve from zero to the elastic limit. In uniaxial tension, under the assumptions of linear elasticity,

$$U_{r}= \frac{\sigma_{y}^2}{2E} = \frac{\sigma_{y}\varepsilon_{y}}{2}$$

where Ur is the modulus of resilience, σy is the yield strength, εy is the yield strain, and E is the Young's modulus. This analysis is not valid for non-linear elastic materials like rubber, for which the approach of area under the curve until elastic limit must be used.

== Unit of resilience ==
Modulus of resilience (U_{r}) is measured in a unit of joule per cubic meter (J·m^{−3}) in the SI system, i.e. elastical deformation energy per surface of test specimen (merely for gauge-length part).

Like the unit of tensile toughness (U_{T}), the unit of resilience can be easily calculated by using area underneath the stress–strain (σ–ε) curve, which gives resilience value, as given below:

U_{r} = Area underneath the stress–strain (σ–ε) curve up to yield = σ × ε
U_{r} [=] Pa × % = (N·m^{−2})·(unitless)
U_{r} [=] N·m·m^{−3}
U_{r} [=] J·m^{−3}

== See also ==
- Toughness
