= Watt-hour per kilogram =

Unit of specific energy

watt-hour per kilogram
- Unit system: Unit accepted for use with SI
- Unit of: Specific energy
- Symbol: W⋅h/kg

Conversions
1 W⋅h/kg in ...	... is equal to ...
- SI units: 3600 J/kg

The watt-hour per kilogram (unit symbols: W⋅h/kg) is a unit of specific energy commonly used to measure the density of energy in batteries and capacitors.

== Conversion to SI units ==
The watt, kilogram, joule, and the second are part of the International System of Units (SI), but the hour is not. Since a watt equals one joule per second and because one hour equals 3600 seconds, one watt-hour per kilogram can be expressed in SI units as 3600 joules per kilogram.

== Typical values ==
As of June 2022, the highest peer reviewed and published results for an electric car battery is an energy density 350 W⋅h/kg, which has achieved 500 cycles with less than 20% capacity fade. This compares to supercapacitors that are typically rated between 3 and 10 W⋅h/kg.

Nuclear batteries based on betavoltaics can reach up to 3300 W⋅h/kg, although over much longer time periods.
