= Specific kinetic energy =

- Common symbols: ke, or e_{k}
- SI unit: J/kg, or m^{2}/s^{2}
- Derivations from other quantities: e_{k} = ½v^{2}

Specific kinetic energy is the kinetic energy of an object per unit of mass.

It is defined as
$$\begin{matrix} e_k = \frac{1}{2} \end{matrix} v^2$$,

where $e_k$ is the specific kinetic energy and $v$ is velocity. Specific kinetic energy is an intensive property, whereas kinetic energy and mass are extensive properties. The SI unit for specific kinetic energy is the joule per kilogram (J/kg), which is equivalent to m^{2}/s^{2}.
