= Specific energy =

Physical quantity representing energy content per unit mass

- Common symbols: $e$
- SI unit: J/kg
- Other units: kcal/g, W⋅h/kg, kW⋅h/kg, Btu/lb
- In SI base units: m^{2}⋅s^{−2}
- Intensive?: Yes
- Derivations from other quantities: $e = E / m$
- Dimension: $\mathsf{L}^2 \mathsf{T}^{-2}$

Specific energy or massic energy is energy per unit mass. It is also known as gravimetric energy density, which is not to be confused with energy density, which is defined as energy per unit volume. It is used to quantify, for example, stored heat and other thermodynamic properties of substances such as specific internal energy, specific enthalpy, specific Gibbs free energy, and specific Helmholtz free energy. It may also be used for the kinetic energy or potential energy of a body. Specific energy is an intensive property, whereas energy and mass are extensive properties.

The SI unit for specific energy is the joule per kilogram (J/kg). Other units still in use worldwide in some contexts are the kilocalorie per gram (Cal/g or kcal/g), mostly in food-related topics, and watt-hours per kilogram (W⋅h/kg) in the field of batteries. In some countries the Imperial unit BTU per pound (Btu/lb) is used in some engineering and applied technical fields.

Specific energy has the same units as specific strength, which is related to the maximum specific energy of rotation an object can have without flying apart due to centrifugal force. The concept of specific energy is related to but distinct from the notion of molar energy in chemistry, that is energy per mole of a substance, which uses units such as joules per mole, or the older but still widely used calories per mole.

== Table of some non-SI conversions ==
The following table shows the factors for conversion to J/kg of some non-SI units:

Unit	SI equivalent
kcal/g	4.184 MJ/kg
Wh/kg	3.6 kJ/kg
kWh/kg	3.6 MJ/kg
Btu/lb	2.326 kJ/kg
Btu/lb	2.32444 kJ/kg

For a table giving the specific energy of many different fuels as well as batteries, see the article Energy density.

== Ionising radiation ==
For ionising radiation, the gray is the SI unit of specific energy absorbed by matter known as absorbed dose, from which the SI unit the sievert is calculated for the stochastic health effect on tissues, known as dose equivalent. The International Committee for Weights and Measures states: "In order to avoid any risk of confusion between the absorbed dose D and the dose equivalent H, the special names for the respective units should be used, that is, the name gray should be used instead of joules per kilogram for the unit of absorbed dose D and the name sievert instead of joules per kilogram for the unit of dose equivalent H."

== Energy density of food ==
Energy density is the amount of energy per mass or volume of food. The energy density of a food can be determined from the label by dividing the energy per serving (usually in kilojoules or food calories) by the serving size (usually in grams, milliliters or fluid ounces). An energy unit commonly used in nutritional contexts within non-metric countries (e.g. the United States) is the "dietary calorie", "food calorie", or "Calorie" with a capital "C" and is commonly abbreviated as "Cal." A nutritional Calorie is equivalent to a thousand chemical or thermodynamic calories (abbreviated "cal" with a lower case "c") or one kilocalorie (kcal). Because food energy is commonly measured in Calories, the energy density of food is commonly called "caloric density". In the metric system, the energy unit commonly used on food labels is the kilojoule (kJ) or megajoule (MJ). Energy density is thus commonly expressed in metric units of cal/g, kcal/g, J/g, kJ/g, MJ/kg, cal/mL, kcal/mL, J/mL, or kJ/mL.

Energy density measures the energy released when the food is metabolized by a healthy organism when it ingests the food (see food energy for calculation). In aerobic environments, this typically requires oxygen as an input and generates waste products such as carbon dioxide and water. Besides alcohol, the only sources of food energy are carbohydrates, fats and proteins, which make up ninety percent of the dry weight of food. Therefore, water content is the most important factor in computing energy density. In general, proteins have lower energy densities (≈16 kJ/g) than carbohydrates (≈17 kJ/g), whereas fats provide much higher energy densities (≈38 kJ/g), 2 1/4 times as much energy. Fats contain more carbon-carbon and carbon-hydrogen bonds than carbohydrates or proteins, yielding higher energy density. Foods that derive most of their energy from fat have a much higher energy density than those that derive most of their energy from carbohydrates or proteins, even if the water content is the same. Nutrients with a lower absorption, such as fiber or sugar alcohols, lower the energy density of foods as well. A moderate energy density would be 1.6 to 3 calories per gram (7–13 kJ/g); salmon, lean meat, and bread would fall in this category. Foods with high energy density have more than 3 calories per gram (13 kJ/g) and include crackers, cheese, chocolate, nuts, and fried foods like potato or tortilla chips.

== Fuel ==
Energy density is sometimes more useful than specific energy for comparing fuels. For example, liquid hydrogen fuel has a higher specific energy (energy per unit mass) than gasoline does, but a much lower volumetric energy density.

== Astrodynamics ==
Specific mechanical energy, rather than simply energy, is often used in astrodynamics, because gravity changes the kinetic and potential specific energies of a vehicle in ways that are independent of the mass of the vehicle, consistent with the conservation of energy in a Newtonian gravitational system.

The specific energy of an object such as a meteoroid falling on the Earth from outside the Earth's gravitational well is at least one half the square of the escape velocity of 11.2 km/s. This comes to 63 MJ/kg (15 kcal/g, or 15 tonnes TNT equivalent per tonne). Comets have even more energy, typically moving with respect to the Sun, when in our vicinity, at about the square root of two times the speed of the Earth. This comes to 42 km/s, or a specific energy of 882 MJ/kg. The speed relative to the Earth may be more or less, depending on direction. Since the speed of the Earth around the Sun is about 30 km/s, a comet's speed relative to the Earth can range from 12 to 72 km/s, the latter corresponding to 2592 MJ/kg. If a comet with this speed fell to the Earth it would gain another 63 MJ/kg, yielding a total of 2655 MJ/kg with a speed of 72.9 km/s. Since the equator is moving at about 0.5 km/s, the impact speed has an upper limit of 73.4 km/s, giving an upper limit for the specific energy of a comet hitting the Earth of about 2690 MJ/kg.

If the Hale-Bopp comet (50 km in diameter) had hit Earth, it would have vaporized the oceans and sterilized the surface of Earth.

== Miscellaneous ==
- Kinetic energy per unit mass: 1/2v^{2}, where v is the speed (giving J/kg when v is in m/s). See also kinetic energy per unit mass of projectiles.
- Potential energy with respect to gravity, close to Earth, per unit mass: gh, where g is the acceleration due to gravity (standardized as ≈9.8 m/s^{2}) and h is the height above the reference level (giving J/kg when g is in m/s^{2} and h is in m).
- Heat: energies per unit mass are specific heat capacity times temperature difference, and specific melting heat, and specific heat of vaporization

== See also ==
- Energy density, which has tables of specific energies of devices and materials
- Power-to-weight ratio
- Heat of combustion
- Specific orbital energy
- Orders of magnitude (energy)
