= Battery recycling =

Process

Battery recycling is a recycling activity that aims to reduce the number of batteries being disposed as municipal solid waste. Batteries contain a number of heavy metals and toxic chemicals and disposing of them by the same process as regular household waste has raised concerns over soil contamination and water pollution. While reducing the amount of pollutants being released through disposal through the uses of landfill and incineration, battery recycling can facilitate the release of harmful materials from batteries to both the environment and the workers recycling batteries.

== Battery recycling by type ==
Most types of batteries can be recycled. However, some batteries are recycled more readily than others, such as lead–acid automotive batteries (nearly 99% are recycled) and button cells (because of the value and toxicity of their chemicals). Rechargeable batteries can also be recycled, including nickel–cadmium (NiCd), nickel–metal hydride (NiMH), lithium-ion (Li-ion), and nickel–zinc (NiZn) types. Disposable alkaline batteries make up the vast majority of consumer battery use, but there is currently no cost-neutral recycling option. Consumer disposal guidelines vary by region. An evaluation of consumer alkaline battery recycling in Europe showed environmental benefit but at significant expense over disposal. Zinc–carbon and Zinc–air batteries are recycled in the same process. E.U. consumers recycled almost half of portable batteries bought in 2017.

=== Lead–acid batteries ===
Lead-acid batteries include but are not limited to: car batteries, golf cart batteries, UPS batteries, industrial forklift batteries, motorcycle batteries, and commercial batteries. These can be regular lead–acid, sealed lead–acid, gel type, or absorbent glass mat batteries. These are recycled by grinding them, neutralizing the acid, and separating the polymers from the lead. The recovered materials are used in a variety of applications, including new batteries.

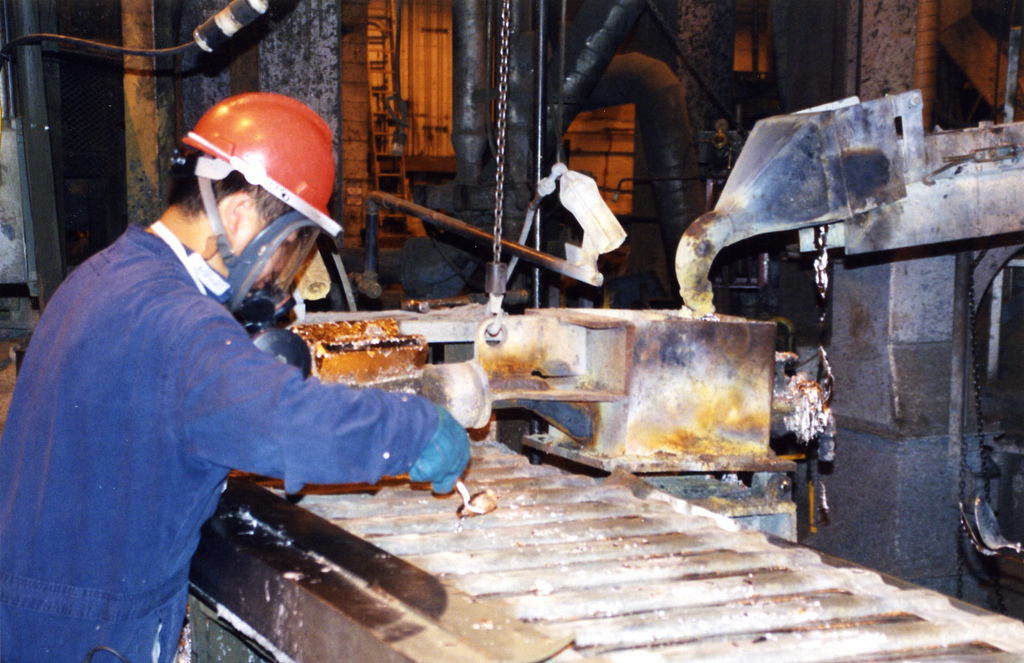
Recycling the lead from batteries

The lead in a lead–acid battery can be recycled. Elemental lead is toxic and should therefore be kept out of the waste stream.

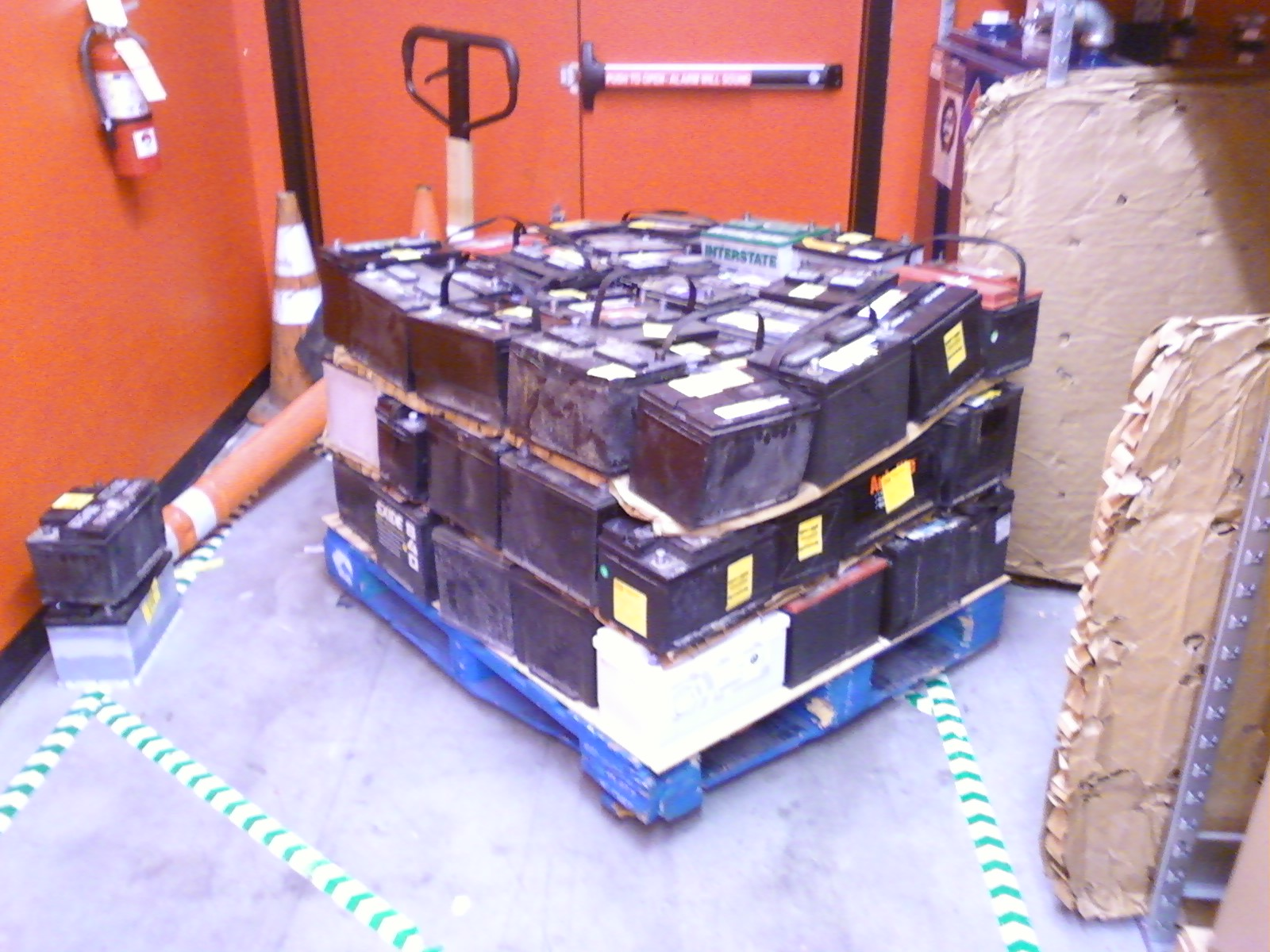
Lead–acid batteries collected by an auto parts retailer for recycling

The casing of a lead–acid battery is often made of either polypropylene or ABS, which can also be recycled, although there are significant limitations on recycling plastics.

Many cities offer battery recycling services for lead–acid batteries. In some jurisdictions, including U.S. states and Canadian provinces, a refundable deposit is paid on batteries. This encourages recycling of old batteries instead of abandonment or disposal with household waste. Businesses that sell new car batteries may also collect used batteries (or be required to do so by law) for recycling.

A 2019 study commissioned by battery-industry promotional group, the Battery Council, calculated battery lead recycling rates in the United States in the period 2014–2018, taking into account battery scrap lead import/export data from the Department of Commerce. The report says that, after accounting for net scrap battery lead exports from the United States, 99.0% of the remaining lead from lead-acid batteries in the United States is reclaimed. The Battery Council figures indicate that around 15.5 billion pounds of battery lead was consumed in the USA in that period, with a net amount of approximately 2 billion pounds battery scrap lead being exported. Of the 13.6 billion pounds remaining after exports, 13.5 billion pounds were recycled.

The U.S. Environmental Protection Agency (EPA), has reported lesser and varying levels of lead-acid battery recycling in the United States in earlier years, under various administrations, Republican and Democrat. The EPA reported in 1987 that varying economics and regulatory requirements have contributed to rates of 97 percent in 1965, above 83 percent in 1980, 61 percent in 1983, and around 70 percent in 1985.

According to a 1992 EPA Superfund report, lead batteries account for about 80% of the lead used in the United States, of which about 60% is reclaimed during times of low lead prices, but more in times of high lead prices; it reported that 50% of the nation's lead needs are filled from recycled lead.

=== Silver-oxide batteries ===
Used most frequently in watches, toys, and some medical devices, silver-oxide batteries contain a small amount of mercury. Most jurisdictions regulate their handling and disposal to reduce the discharge of mercury into the environment. Silver oxide batteries can be recycled to recover the mercury through the use of both Hydrometallurgical methods and pyrometallurgical methods.

More recent silver oxide batteries no longer contain mercury and the process of recycling them does not give cause for concern for releasing mercury into the environment.

=== Lithium-ion batteries ===
Estimates for recycling rates for lithium batteries vary greatly. The U.S. Government and others estimating in 2021 that at most 15% were recycled at end of life in 2019. However, some recycling advocates claim that most lithium-ion batteries (Li-ion) were recycled. They contain lithium and high-grade copper and aluminium. Depending on the active material, they may also contain cobalt and nickel. Many products use lithium-ion batteries from electronics and handheld power tools to electric vehicles (EVs) and electrical energy storage systems. To prevent a future shortage of cobalt, nickel, and lithium and to enable a sustainable life cycle of these technologies, recycling processes for lithium batteries are needed. These processes have to regain not only cobalt, nickel, copper, and aluminium from spent battery cells, but also a significant share of lithium. Other potentially valuable and recoverable materials are graphite and manganese. Recycling processes today recover approximately 25% to 96% of the materials of a lithium-ion battery cell. In order to achieve this goal, several steps are combined into complex process chains, while ensuring safety.

These steps are:

- Deactivation or discharging of the battery (especially in case of batteries from electric vehicles)
- Disassembly of battery systems (especially in case of batteries from electric vehicles)
- Mechanical processes (including crushing, sorting, and sieving processes)
- Electrolyte recovery
- Metal recovery processes (including hydrometallurgical processes, pyrometallurgical processes, or direct recycling)

It is expected that a market for lithium recycled from batteries will exist by 2040, and this could add pressure on hard-rock lithium mining which produces relatively expensive lithium compared with lithium from brines. Lithium mining in Australia is in particular expected to be negatively impacted.

==== Hydrometallurgical method ====
One or more of these metal recovery processes are used to recover critical metals from battery waste. In hydrometallurgical methods, metals are first extracted in aqueous solution, typically using acids (such as sulfuric acid) and hydrogen peroxide as a reducing agent. This is followed by the selective precipitation of the metals as salts. Hydrometallurgical processes have several advantages, such as low energy consumption, low cost and little hazardous gas emission. However, the use of dangerous acids during extraction poses safety concerns. Additionally, the method requires extensive and complicated processing to selectively precipitate each metal salt.

==== Pyrometallurgical method ====
Similar to hydrometallurgical methods, the primary aim of most pyrometallurgical recycling processes is the recovery of valuable minerals (especially Li, Co, and Ni) from the cathode electrode. Thus, the first step is frequently the separation of the cathode material from the rest of the cell components (such as polymer binders, organic electrolyte solutions, and aluminum foil current collectors). In typical pyrometallurgical processes, this separation step can be divided into two categories: incineration (burning organic components in an oxygen rich environment) and pyrolysis (decomposition of organic components without oxygen). While incineration generally requires lower temperatures and shorter times than pyrolysis, pyrolysis offers the advantage of lower CO/CO_{2} emissions and the potential to recover some organic compounds (such as fluorine containing electrolytes) by capturing and processing the off-gases. After decomposing the organic components of the cell, the remaining cathode material can either be separated from the Al current collector for roasting or the cathode and current collector can be used together for smelting. Smelting can also be performed without pretreatment using the entire battery cell, but this requires additional low temperature steps to prevent explosions from rapid electrolyte evaporation.

For smelting processes, high temperatures (typically in excess of 1000 °C) are used to melt the Al-cathode mixture, which then reacts with the slag mixture (most commonly the CaO-SiO_{2}-Al_{2}O_{3} system) to form a transition metal (Co, Ni, Fe, Cu) rich alloy phase below the slag. This alloy phase can then be refined using traditional leaching methods to separate and purify the metallic species. While the conventional smelting process cannot recover Li or Mn from cathode materials (as these species will segregate to the slag), changes in the slag system (such as the shift to MnO-SiO_{2}-Al_{2}O_{3}) have been proposed to allow for recovery of these metals as well.

In roasting processes, the cathode material is heated in the presence of either a carbon source (a carbothermic reaction, like the production of Fe from iron ores) or a salt compound (salt-roasting, frequently using sulfate or chloride containing salts) to yield extractable forms of the desired metals. In the carbothermal reduction process, the result is a mixed-metal alloy similar that of the smelting process but using a lower temperature of 650-1000 °C. In the salt-assisted process, the reaction of the cathode material with the salts produces water-soluble metal products that can be easily recovered. This can also be done at temperatures as low as 200 °C in some systems. Both roasting approaches also have the benefit of being able to recover Li from the spent batteries without significant process changes since Li will undergo similar reactions to the transition metals in each process.

Due to its flexibility and simplicity of scaling, pyrometallurgy is one of the most widely used techniques for lithium-ion battery recycling, including by companies like Umicore, Sony, and GEM. However, while pyrometallurgy produces less hazardous waste than hydrometallurgical processes, it suffers from both high capital costs and high energy use, as well as substantial process-related CO_{2} emissions.

==== Direct recycling ====
Direct recycling is an emerging battery recycling method that focuses on directly regenerating cathode materials without damaging the crystal structure. This is distinct from existing hydro- and pyrometallurgical methods, which break down the cathode into precursors and require subsequent processing to regenerate cathode materials. Maintaining the cathode structure represents an important increase in efficiency, since it produces a higher-value product than other recycling methods. To perform direct recycling, the cathode "black mass" (containing critical metals such as Li, Co, Mn, and Ni) must be separated from other battery components. Traditional separation methods, primarily battery shredding, are insufficient, as they introduce impurities into the cathode. Alternative separation methods include the use of solvents to recover the black mass. Many of the organic solvents investigated for this process are toxic and pose hazards to both humans and the environment. Identifying safer solvents which can effectively separate the black mass is a topic of current research. Once the cathode black mass is obtained, the material undergoes relithiation to reintroduce lithium which is "lost" during battery use and restore the cathode to its original capacity. This relithiation process can be carried out via several different methods, including solid state, electrochemical, or solution-based relithiation. While direct recycling is not yet commercialized, research indicates that it can restore cathode materials to their original electrochemical capacity and performance.

==== Potential dangers ====
Specific dangers associated with lithium-ion battery recycling processes include electrical, chemical, and thermal dangers, and their potential interactions. A complicating factor is the water sensitivity: lithium hexafluorophosphate, a possible electrolyte material, reacts with water to form hydrofluoric acid; cells are often immersed in a solvent to prevent this. Once removed, the jelly rolls are separated and the materials removed by ultrasonic agitation, leaving the electrodes ready for melting and recycling.

Pouch cells are easier to recycle to salvage copper despite significant safety issues.

In-situ regeneration

In-situ regeneration is a new method to extend the usable lifespan of lithium-ion and other metal-ion batteries. Compared to direct recycling, this method does not directly look to correct for structural defects in the cathode active material (CAM), such as the formation of inactive crystal structures, the trapping of lithium, or microfractures, but introduces additional lithium into the anode active material, correcting lithium deficiencies. This method does not require the complete disassembly of batteries but does require the exchange of electrolytes into and out of the cell, which would require a change in how cells are treated at a packaging level to accommodate for this. Due to the limited scope of correction that in-situ regeneration can make, it works well with materials whose degradation mechanism is often through the loss of trapped lithium such as lithium iron phosphate (LFP).

One such regeneration method is the use of LiSO_{2}CF_{3} dissolved in electrolyte, which decomposes as follows during charging:

Li^{+}(aq) + SO_{2}CF_{3}^{−} (aq) → Li (in anode) + SO_{2} (g) + C_{2}F_{6} (g)

This method causes additional Li^{+} to be deposited in the anode, replenishing any lithium lost during cycling while allowing the excess gas to be purged out. This method has shown good results, with one LFP pouch cell showing 96% capacity after the battery's 6th refresh at 11,818 cycles when cycled in a lab at 1C. This method has not yet been commercialized, but it provides a promising outlook for the long-term sustainability of battery technology.

==== Recovered materials ====
Extraction of lithium from old batteries is five times more expensive than mined lithium. However, lithium extraction from Li-ion batteries has been demonstrated in small setups by various entities as well as in production scale by battery material recycling companies like Electra Battery Materials and Redwood Materials, Inc.

A critical part of recycling economics is the value of the recovered cobalt. Manufacturers working to remove cobalt from their products might produce the unintended consequence of reducing recycling. A novel approach is to maintain the cathode's crystalline structure, eliminating the significant energy expense of recreating it. Another approach is to use ultrasound for separating the individual cathode components.

While cathode materials are the focus of most recycling efforts due to their high economic value, recycling additional battery components could improve the overall sustainability of lithium-ion batteries. Studies have found that components such as the battery casing, current collectors, electrolyte, and separators have potential to be recycled given further research into processing methods. In addition, recycling anode materials (primarily graphite) could significantly increase the recovery of lithium from spent batteries, since much of the lithium "lost" during battery use ends up in the anode.

==== Research ====
Energy saving and effective recycling solutions for lithium-ion batteries can reduce the carbon footprint of the production of lithium-ion batteries significantly. As of 2022, several facilities are operating and under construction, including Fredrikstad in Norway and a black mass facility in Magdeburg, Germany in 2023.

In early 2022, research published in Joule showed that recycling existing lithium-ion batteries by focusing on a method that refurbishes the cathode showed that this technique perform just as well as those with a cathode made from original materials. The study showed that the batteries using the recycled cathode charged faster and lasted longer than new batteries.

By 2023, several companies had moved beyond research and had set up process lines to recycle commercial quantities of Li-ion batteries. In its Nevada pilot plant, the Redwood Materials process had recovered more than 95% of important metals (including lithium, cobalt, nickel and copper) from 230,000 kg (500,000 lb) of old NiMH and Li-Ion packs.

Recently, research from Gunther Rupprechter laboratory published in Green Chemistry demonstrated that Ni recovered from the cathode powder of spent NiMH batteries can be upcycled into a catalyst (Ni/η-Al_{2}O_{3}), which enables the production of synthetic fuel (methane) through CO_{2} hydrogenation at a relatively low temperature of 250°C, reducing e-waste while supporting clean energy and CO_{2} utilization.

=== Battery composition by type ===
Italics designates button cell types.
Bold designates secondary types.
All figures are percentages; due to rounding they may not add up to exactly 100.

Type	Fe	Mn	Ni	Zn	Hg	Li	Ag	Cd	Co	Al	Pb	Other	KOH	Paper	Plastic	Alkali	C	Acids	Water	Other
Alkaline	24.8	22.3	0.5	14.9								1.3		1	2.2	5.4	3.7		10.1	14
Zinc–carbon	16.8	15		19.4							0.1	0.8		0.7	4	6	9.2		12.3	15.2
Lithium	50	19	1			2									7		2			19
Mercury-oxide	37	1	1	14	31								2		3		1		3	7
Zinc–air	42			35	1										4	4	1		10	3
Lithium	60	18	1			3									3		2			13
Alkaline	37	23	1	11	0.6										6	2	2		6	14
Silver-oxide	42	2	2	9	0.4		31					4			2	1	0.5		2	4
Nickel–cadmium	35		22					15							10	2			5	11
NiMH	20	1	35	1					4			10			9	4			8	8
Li-ion	22					3			18	5		11					13			28
Lead–acid											65	4			10			16		5

== Battery recycling by location ==
Battery recycling is an international industry, with many nations exporting their used or spent lead-acid batteries to other nations for recycling. Consequently, it can be difficult to get accurate analyses of individual nations' exact rate of domestic recycling.

Further, in many countries, lead-acid battery recycling (chiefly from automobiles and motorcycles) is commonly done informally by individuals or informal enterprises, with little or no formal record-keeping, nor effective regulatory oversight.

Spent lead–acid batteries are generally designated as "hazardous waste" and subject to relevant safety, storage, handling and transport regulations, though those vary from country to country. A multilateral international agreement, the Basel Convention, officially governs all transboundary movements of hazardous waste for recovery or disposal, among the 172 signatory countries. (The U.S. is not a party, but has alternate arrangements with the Organisation for Economic Co-operation and Development (OECD), and with Canada and with Mexico (where it ships many lead-acid batteries for recycling).

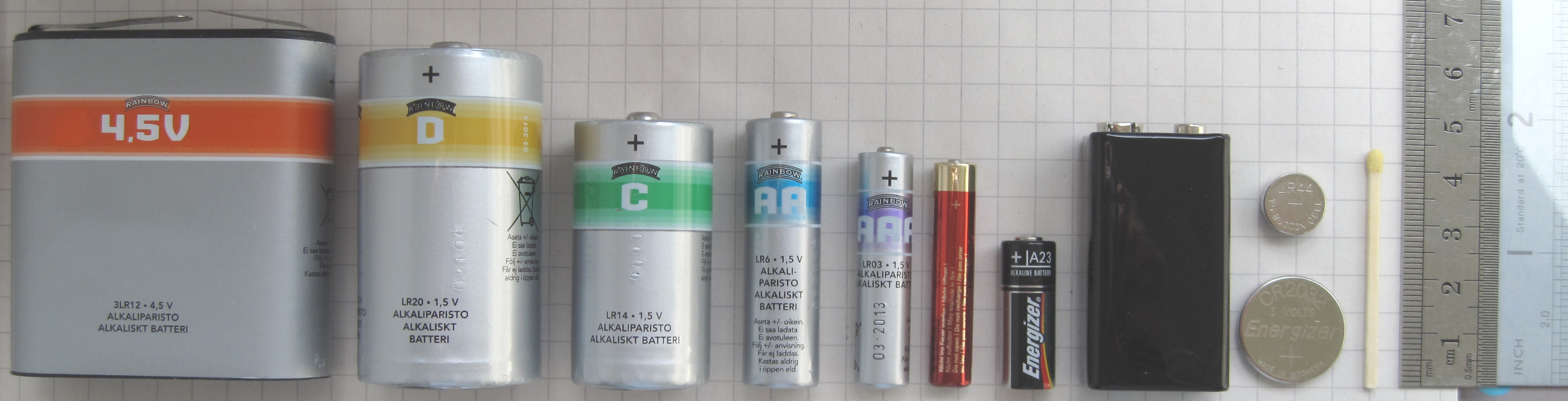
4.5-Volt, D, C, AA, AAA, AAAA, A23, 9-Volt, CR2032, and LR44 cells are all recyclable in most countries.

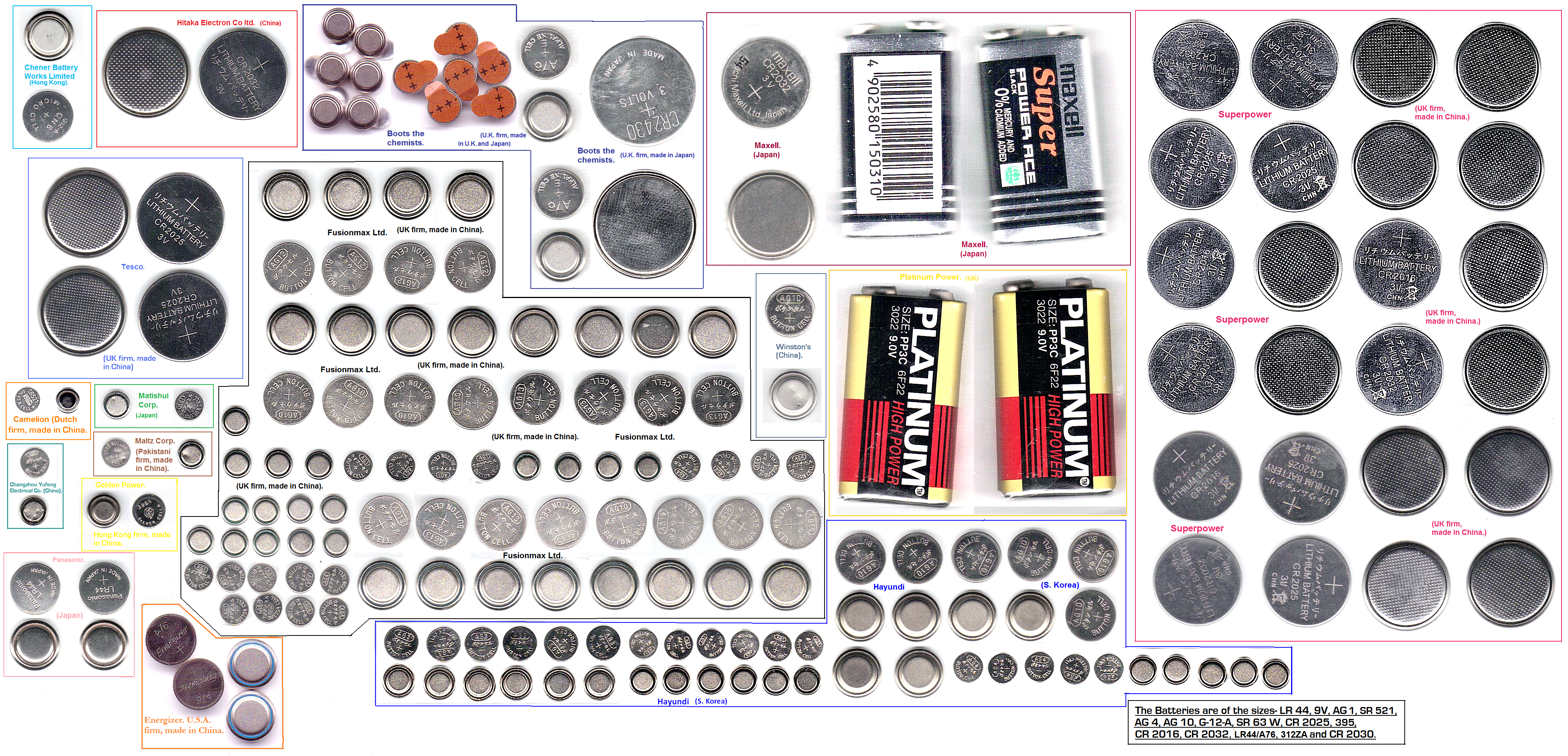
Several sizes of button and coin cell. They are all recyclable in the UK and Ireland.

Country	Return percentage	
Country	2002	2012
Switzerland	61%	73%
Belgium	59%	63%
Sweden	55%	60%
Germany	39%	44%
Austria	44%	–
Netherlands	32%	–
United Kingdom	–	32%
France	16%	–
Finland	15%	40%
Canada	3%	5.6%

^{*} Figures for Q1 and Q2 2012.

Australia

The recycling industry in Australia as of 2026 has had a focus on lithium battery recycling. Industry waste chiefs and the Australian Council of Recycling (ACOR) estimate there are between 10,000 and 12,000 battery-related fires a year in Australia's waste, rubbish truck, and recycling streams. Envirostream Australia is the first onshore company to offer lithium and mixed battery recycling in Australia. Operating as a wholly owned subsidiary of Livium Ltd (formerly Lithium Australia), it provides an environmentally sustainable collection and processing. The business model utilizes an upstream "fee-for-service" framework, where clients pay a set collection and processing rate up front.

Second-Life battery repurposing is currently of national interest with companies including Li-ion Energy (Perth), Sustainable Lithium Cells Australia and InfinitEV continuing research and development in battery re-use technologies.

=== European Union ===
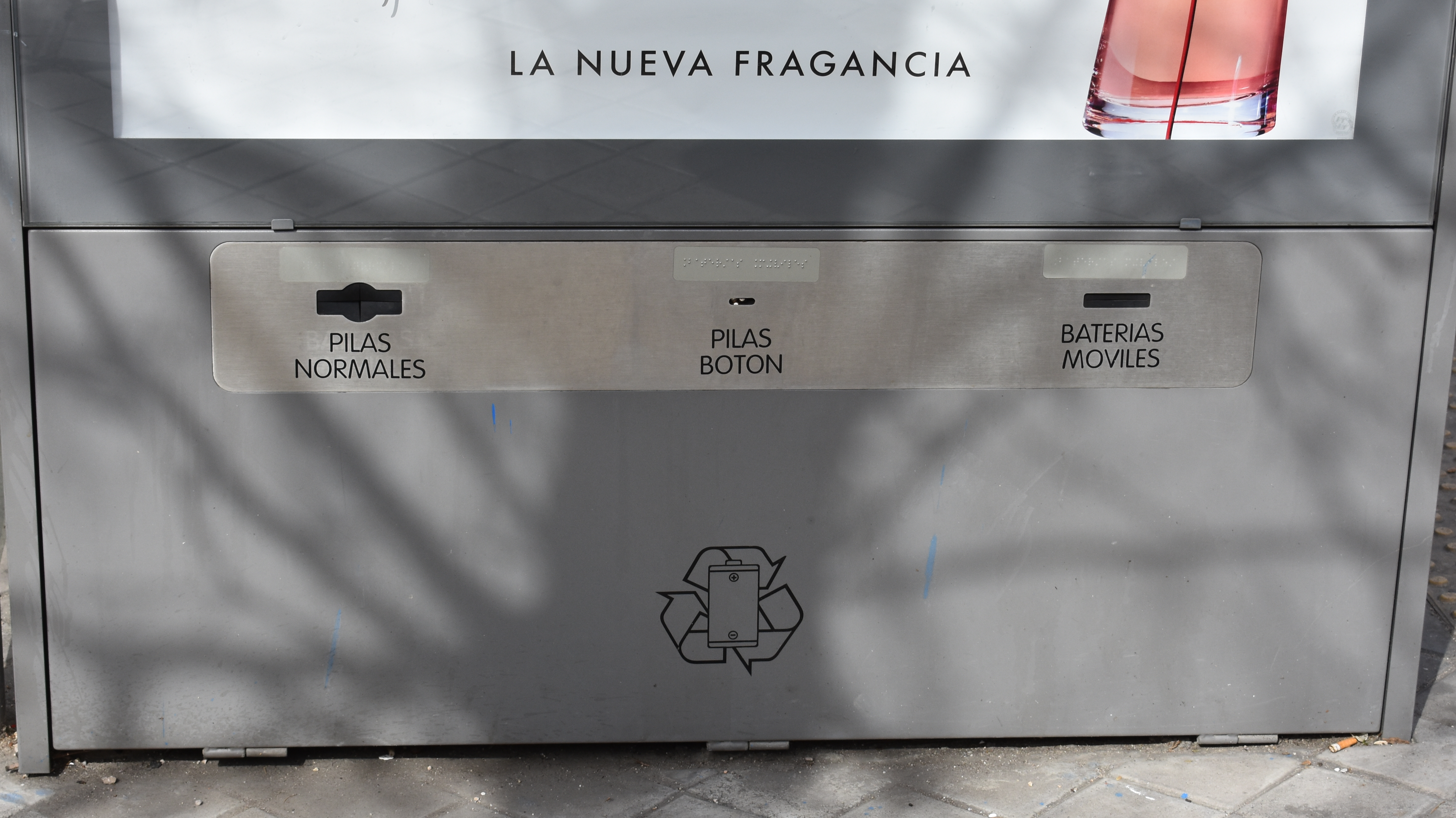
A battery recycling station at a bus stop in Madrid.

In 2006, the European Union passed the Battery Directive, one of the aims of which is a higher rate of battery recycling. The EU directive states that at least 25% of all the EU's used batteries must be collected by 2012, and rising to no less than 45% by 2016, of which at least 50% must be recycled. In 2020, 47% of batteries in the EU were collected for recycling. In 2023, the EU adopted new Batteries Regulation, which updates rules for calculating and verifying rates of recycling efficiency.

=== Channel Islands ===
In early 2009, Guernsey took the initiative by setting up the Longue Hougue recycling facility, which, among other functions, offers a drop-off point for used batteries so they can be recycled off-island. The resulting publicity meant that a lot of people complied with the request to dispose of batteries responsibly.

=== United Kingdom ===
From April 2005 to March 2008, the UK non-governmental body WRAP conducted trials of collection methods for battery recycling around the UK. The methods tested were: Kerbside, retail drop-off, community drop-off, postal, and hospital and fire station trials. The kerbside trials collected the most battery mass, and were the most well-received and understood by the public. The community drop-off containers that were spread around local community areas were also relatively successful in terms of mass of batteries collected. The lowest performing were the hospital and fire service trials (although these served their purpose very well for specialized battery types like hearing aid and smoke alarm batteries). Retail drop off trials were by volume the second most effective method but one of the least well received and used by the public. Both the kerbside and postal trials received the highest awareness and community support.

Household batteries can be recycled in the UK at council recycling sites as well as at some shops and shopping centers, e.g. Currys, and The Link.

A scheme started in 2008 by Sainsbury's allowed household batteries to be posted free of charge in envelopes available at their shops. This scheme was cancelled at the request of the Royal Mail because of hazardous industrial battery waste being sent, as well as household batteries.

From 1 February 2010, batteries can be recycled anywhere the "Be Positive" sign appears. Shops and online retailers that sell more than 32 kilograms of batteries a year must offer facilities to recycle batteries. This is equivalent to one pack of four AA batteries a day. Shops that sell this amount must by law provide recycling facilities as of 1 February 2010.

In Great Britain an increasing number of shops (Argos, Homebase, B&Q, Tesco, and Sainsbury's) are providing battery return boxes and cylinders for their customers.

=== North America ===
The rechargeable battery industry has formed the Rechargeable Battery Recycling Corporation (RBRC), which operates a battery recycling program called Call2Recycle throughout the United States and Canada. RBRC provides businesses with prepaid shipping containers for rechargeable batteries of all types while consumers can drop off batteries at numerous participating collection centers. It claims that no component of any recycled battery eventually reaches a landfill. Other programs, such as the Big Green Box program, offer a recycling option for all chemistries, including primary batteries such as alkaline and primary lithium.

A study estimated battery recycling rates in Canada based on RBRC data. In 2002, it wrote, the collection rate was 3.2%. This implies that 3.2% of rechargeable batteries were recycled, and the rest were thrown in the trash. By 2005, it concluded, the collection rate had risen to 5.6%.

In 2009, Kelleher Environmental updated the study. The update estimates the following. "Collection rate values for the 5 [and] 15-year hoarding assumptions respectively are: 8% to 9% for NiCd batteries; 7% to 8% for NiMH batteries; and 45% to 72% for lithium ion and lithium polymer batteries combined. Collection rates through the [RBRC] program for all end of life small sealed lead acid (SLA) consumer batteries were estimated at 10% for 5-year and 15-year hoarding assumptions. [...] It should also be stressed that these figures do not take collection of secondary consumer batteries through other sources into account, and actual collection rates are likely higher than these values."

A November 2011 The New York Times article reported that batteries collected in the United States are increasingly being transported to Mexico for recycling as a result of a widening gap between the strictness of environmental and labor regulations between the two countries, an example of the pollution haven hypothesis.

In 2015, Energizer announced availability of disposable AAA and AA alkaline batteries made with 3.8% to 4% (by weight) of recycled batteries, branded as EcoAdvanced.

=== Japan ===
Japan does not have a single national battery recycling law, so the advice given is to follow local and regional statutes and codes in disposing batteries. The Battery Association of Japan (BAJ) recommends that alkaline, zinc-carbon, and lithium primary batteries can be disposed of as normal household waste. The BAJ's stance on button cell and secondary batteries is toward recycling and increasing national standardisation of procedures for dealing with these types of batteries.

In April 2004, the Japan Portable Rechargeable Battery Recycling Center (JBRC) was created to handle and promote battery recycling throughout Japan. They provide battery recycling containers to shops and other collection points.

=== India ===
India is one of the world's chief consumers of lead–acid batteries, according to the India Lead Zinc Development Association (ILZDA). India, with its recent rapid rise in average wealth, has seen a marked increase in motor vehicles, and a corresponding increase in lead-acid battery recycling.

India lacks a formally planned recycling industry. The industry is not respected, and lacks designated zones for recycling. However, in a nation with a vast population of people still in poverty, most lead-acid battery recycling is by individuals and small informal enterprises, often taking no safety or environmental precautions.

ILZDA has demanded multiple changes to India's industry and its regulation, including the registration of all battery dealers, and the collection of their returns, and recognition of the best-registered recyclers, while enforcing punishments for violators of government regulations.

Two of India's largest lead companies—lead manufacturer/exporter Gravita India and lead battery manufacturer Amara Raja—partnered to annually recycle 8,000 tonnes of lead scrap from Amara Raja's facilities, and return it to them for re-use (Gravita said it can recycle and process up to 50,000 tonnes of lead and aluminium yearly). The companies said the joint program is to advance environment protection and sustainability.

A lithium battery recycling facility opened in 2025.

== Health and environmental concerns ==
Despite the positive outlooks on battery recycling, negative effects have also been shown to impact developing nations that recycle batteries, especially those with lead and lithium.

Lead is a highly toxic substance, and processing it can result in pollution and contamination of people, resulting in long-term health problems and even disability. According to one ranking, lead-acid battery recycling is, by far, the most deadly industrial process, globally, in terms of disability-adjusted life years lost—costing between 2,000,000 and 4,800,000 estimated lost years of individual human life.

Since 2015, developing nations like Vietnam have increased their battery processing capacity as global demand for batteries has grown. The process for recycling batteries often leads to toxic metals being introduced into the environment. In many of these nations, there are little protections available for workers working with the batteries. In nations like Indonesia, it was reported that over a span of four years, battery recyclers' blood lead levels almost doubled. Lead exposure to workers can also be transmitted to family members away from work, ultimately leading to lead poisoning.

More studies continue to be conducted to gather an understanding of environmental impacts. Studies show that most lithium-ion batteries contain Per- and polyfluoroalkyl substances (PFAS). PFAS accumulates in humans and wildlife, often leading to immune and thyroid disfunctions, liver diseases, and other issues relating to homeostasis inside of the body. Lead contamination of neighborhoods has resulted from the process of recycling lead batteries. In 1992, the EPA reported 29 lead-recycling sites were on the EPA's Superfund clean-up list, 22 of them on their "National Priority List."

== See also ==
- Electronic waste
- Waste Electrical and Electronic Equipment Directive
- Electric battery
- Rechargeable battery
