= Günther Rupprechter =

Austrian scientist

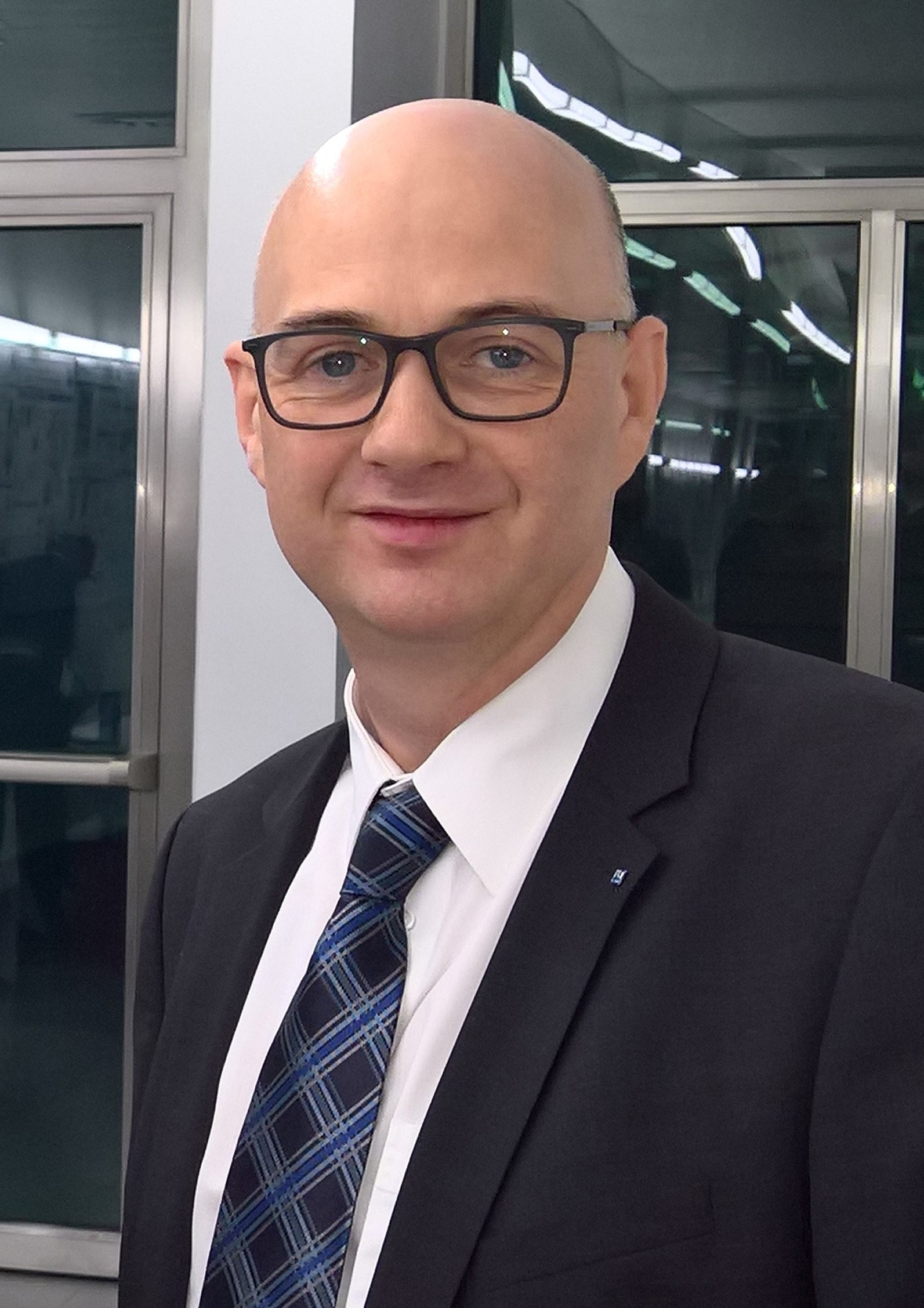
- Born: July 1, 1966 (age 60); Jenbach, Austria
- Citizenship: Austrian
- Education: University of Innsbruck
- Known for: Physical chemistry, Surface science, Nanoscience, Nanotechnology
- Awards: Jochen Block Award of the German Catalysis Society (DECHEMA) Austrian Academy of Sciences (ÖAW) European Academy of Sciences (EurASc)
- Scientific career
- Workplaces: Technische Universität Wien Technische Universität Berlin Fritz Haber Institute Max Planck Society Lawrence Berkeley National Laboratory University of California at Berkeley University of Innsbruck
- Website: https://www.tuwien.at/tch/imc

Professor Günther Rupprechter (born July 1, 1966, in Jenbach, Austria) is an Austrian scientist, full professor and currently Head of the Institute of Materials Chemistry, Technische Universität Wien (TU Wien). He has worked in physical chemistry, surface science, nanoscience and nanotechnology, particularly in the area of catalytic surface reactions on heterogeneous catalysts, identifying fundamental reaction steps at the atomic level by in situ and operando spectroscopy and microscopy.

Rupprechter is "Director of Research" (speaker) of the FWF-funded Cluster of Excellence "Materials for Energy Conversion and Storage (COE MECS)", including 19 research groups at 4 Austrian universities/institutions. The COE MECS (2023–2028, with an option of extension to 2033) is one of three COEs in the natural sciences (among five first Clusters of Excellence in Austria).

== Education ==
Günther Rupprechter earned a Master of Science in Chemistry (Mag. rer. nat.) with summa cum laude honors from the University of Innsbruck, Austria, in 1992. In his PhD in Physical Chemistry (Dr. rer. nat.), he worked with Konrad Hayek at the Institute of Physical Chemistry of the University of Innsbruck, Austria. Rupprechter studied nanocatalysts by high resolution electron microscopy and got his PhD in 1996, also with summa cum laude honors. Part of the thesis work was carried out at the Max Planck Institute of Microstructure Physics (Halle an der Saale, Germany).

== Career ==
After postdoctoral research in the Department of Chemistry of the University of California at Berkeley and E.O. Lawrence Berkeley National Laboratory (1996–1998 with Prof. Gábor A. Somorjai), Rupprechter became Group Leader for Laser Spectroscopy & Catalysis (1998–2006) at the Fritz Haber Institute, Max Planck Society, Chemical Physics Department, Berlin, Germany. In 2005, he was awarded a Habilitation in Physical Chemistry from Technische Universität Berlin, Germany. In the same year, Rupprechter was appointed Professor (chair) of Surface & Interface Chemistry at the Institute of Materials Chemistry, Technische Universität Wien (TU Wien), Austria. Since 2010, he is Head of the institute.

== Research ==
Rupprechter's current research interests are primarily focused on catalytic surface reactions on heterogeneous catalysts. His research group employs a four-pronged approach:

1. Surface-Science-Based Model Catalysts: Prof. Rupprechter's work on planar model catalysts aims to understand fundamental processes that occur on catalytic surfaces via in situ/operando surface spectroscopy and microscopy, bridging both the materials and pressure gaps.
2. Atomically Precise Clusters: He investigates atomically precise clusters to gain insights and control the behavior of catalytic materials.
3. Industrial-Grade Nanomaterials: His research extends to the study of industrial-grade nanomaterials, which have practical applications in catalytic processes.
4. Microkinetic Modeling and Simulation: The interpretation and verification of experimental operando spectra/images/patterns typically rely on theoretical support.

Rupprechter's overarching goal is to elucidate the molecular mechanisms of reactions relevant to a clean environment, energy conversion, and efficient resource utilization. Among others, molecular mechanisms of hydrogen as clean fuel, methane reforming, CO_{2} and olefin hydrogenation, efficient automotive catalysis, and waste valorization were studied. Materials of interest include mono- (Pt, Pd, Rh, Cu, Ni, Au, Co) and bimetallic (PdZn, Pd_{2}Ga, PdCu, CuNi, CuZn, PdAu, AgAu, CuAu, RhAu) nanoparticles on supporting (mixed) oxides (Al_{2}O_{3}, SiO_{2}, CeO_{2}, PrO_{2}, ZrO_{2}, TiO_{2}, ZnO, MgO, Ga_{2}O_{3}, Co_{3}O_{4}), perovskites (LCO, LSF), and carbon (HOPG, GR, GR-NPs).

== Academic Leadership ==
From 2011 to 2019, Rupprechter served as the Speaker/Coordinator of the FWF-funded Special Research Program (SFB) "Functional Oxide Surfaces and Interfaces (FOXSI)," involving 150 researchers in 10 research groups. He directed the TU Wien funded Doctorate school "Catalysis Materials and Technology" with 11 research groups from 2011 to 2014.

Since Oct. 1st, 2023, Prof. Rupprechter holds the position of "Director of Research" of the FWF-funded Cluster of Excellence "Materials for Energy Conversion and Storage (MECS)."

Prof. Rupprechter has/had several leadership roles in professional societies such as the Austrian Chemical Society (GÖCH) and the Chemical Physical Society. He is Vicechair of the Austrian Catalysis Society, thus Austrian Representative in the European Federation of Catalysis Societies (EFCATS) and the International Association of Catalysis Societies (IACS). He has been Austrian Representative in various European COST Actions: CA22123 - European Materials Acceleration Center for Energy (EU-MACE; Management Committee); MP0903 - Nanoalloys as advanced materials: from structure to properties and applications (NANOALLOY; Management Committee); CM0904 - Network for intermetallic compounds as catalysts for steam reforming of methanol (IMC-SRM; Vice Chair, Management Committee; STSM Coordinator); 540 - Photocatalytic technologies and novel nanosurfaces materials - critical issues (PHONASUM; Management Committee).

Rupprechter has (co-)organized of academic conferences and summer schools, e.g. the annual "International Workshop on Chemistry and Physics of Novel Materials" (with P. Blaha), the EFCATS Summer School "Engineering Materials for Catalysis 2020" (with Albin Pintar and Nataša Novak Tušar: Portorož-Portorose, Slovenia), the Faraday Discussion on "Photoelectron Spectroscopy: New Horizons in Surface Analysis", London, UK (2022), the "GÖCh-Symposium - Physikalische Chemie und Elektrochemie in Österreich 2023" and the upcoming 16th Pannonian International Symposium on Catalysis (Seggau/Styria, Austria; September 1–5, 2024; with C. Rameshan).

== Awards and honors ==
Rupprechter has received several awards and honors including:

- Jochen Block Award of the German Catalysis Society (DECHEMA) in 2005 for his contributions to applying surface science methods to heterogeneous catalysis.
- Corresponding Member of the Austrian Academy of Sciences since 2012.
- Visiting professor at Shanghai University of Engineering Science from 2018 to 2022.
- Guest Professor at Kasetsart University Bangkok in 2023.
- Fellow of the European Academy of Sciences (EurASc) since 2023.

== Editorial Activities ==
- Editorial board member of Catalysis Letters and Topics in Catalysis.
- Guest Editor of special journal issues on catalysis and surface science.

== Academic Supervision ==
Rupprechter has been involved in academic supervision, having supervised 22 Post-docs and 27 PhD students.

== Key Scientific Contributions ==
Examining functioning catalysts at near atmospheric pressure (NAP) and realistic temperature is crucial to obtain a fundamental understanding, Rupprechter has developed dedicated UHV-compatible high-pressure cells for model catalysts (single crystals, thin films, nanoparticles), enabling sum frequency generation (SFG) laser spectroscopy, polarization-modulation infrared reflection absorption spectroscopy (PM-IRAS), and X-ray photoelectron spectroscopy (NAP-XPS) under reaction conditions. For industrial-grade nanomaterials, corresponding in situ (operando) spectroscopy is carried out by Fourier transform infrared spectroscopy (FTIR and DRIFTS), X-ray absorption spectroscopy (XAS), NAP-XPS, and X-ray diffraction (XRD). Significant advances were made in directly imaging the local kinetics of surface reactions by in situ surface (correlative) microscopy, with photoemission electron microscopy (PEEM), scanning photoelectron microscopy (SPEM) and field emission/ion microscopy (FEM/FIM) applied to metals and metal/oxide interfaces. Most studies were carried out at synchrotron sources and in lock-step with theory collaborations (DFT and micro-kinetics).

=== Model Catalysis ===
- Rupprechter is among the early researchers in ambient pressure surface science, developing and applying UHV-compatible high-pressure (HP) cells for combined in situ surface spectroscopy and kinetics: sum frequency generation (SFG) with Gábor A. Somorjai, SFG/PM-IRAS with Hans-Joachim Freund, near atmospheric pressure- X-ray photoelectron spectroscopy (NAP-XPS) with V.I. Bukhtiyarov (J. Phys. Chem. C 2003/2004). This enabled atmospheric pressure studies of UHV-grown model systems, creating the vital link to technological catalysis. Among several constructed HP cells, one specific design is used by several groups worldwide.
- First demonstration of SFG spectroscopy on oxide supported Pd nanoparticles, revealing size and pressure (ultra high vacuum-UHV to mbar) effects in CO adsorption. This triggered many follow-up studies, also combined with NAP-XPS. His SFG activities continue till today, including single crystals, thin films, and nanoparticles.
- Combining atmospheric pressure reaction kinetics of the complex 1-butene hydrogenation and isomerization on Pd single crystals and Pd/Al_{2}O_{3} model catalysts with density functional theory (DFT) calculations and microkinetic modeling (with A. Genest and N. Rösch), the particle size-dependent selectivity could be rationalized based on the abundance and specific properties of the contributing nanoparticle facets.

=== Model and Applied Catalysis ===
- Molecular-level operando insights into selective methanol steam reforming on PdZn and PdGa intermetallics (NAP-XPS, PM-IRAS, concentration modulation IR, EXAFS, DFT; with B. Klötzer, D. Ferri, K.M. Neyman). He was able to link reaction selectivity to the catalyst's atomic and electronic (VB) structure, backed by DFT (JPC C 2015). Model and applied studies blended well together.
- Studies of ZrO_{2}-based reforming catalysts by in situ (synchrotron) NAP-XPS and XAS spectroscopy, employing ultrathin (trilayer) ZrO_{2} films (Surf. Sci. 2019, JPC C 2015) and nano powders of ZrO_{2} and ZrO_{2}/CeO_{2} (Catal. Tod. 2016/2017). Further studies of methane dry reforming demonstrated SMSI effects (J. Phys. Cond. Matt. 2018), Ni surface segregation in bimetallic CuNi/ZrO_{2}, and coke suppression for Ni/ZrO_{2}/CeO_{2}.

=== Applied Catalysis ===
- Operando surface spectroscopy (XAS, NAP-XPS, FTIR, XRD) of CO oxidation and PROX on Co_{3}O_{4} catalysts, exploiting both static and dynamic conditions, revealed a complex reaction network. The presumably active (oxygen vacancy) sites were a minority species. Further studies contrasted Co_{3}O_{4} to Co_{3}O_{4}/CeO_{2} and CoO (J. Phys.: Cond. Matt. 2022, Chem. Europ. J. 2021, Catal. Tod. 2019).
- Surface chemistry of Au clusters on ceria-praseodymium mixed oxide supports: Au/Ce_{4}Pr_{1}O_{x} exhibited the highest activity in water gas shift, with combined experimental and theoretical studies showing that asymmetric O vacancies facilitate H_{2}O dissociation. Using thiolate-protected atomically precise Au clusters on various supports as truly monodisperse catalysts.
- Waste-valorized synthesis and application of methanol sensors, self-cleaning paint and nanowebs for water purification.

=== In Situ/Operando Surface Microscopy ===
Locally resolved imaging of ongoing surface reactions by photoemission electron microscopy (PEEM), directly revealing phenomena such as facet-resolved catalytic ignition, multi-frequential oscillations, anisotropic surface oxidation, coexisting multi-states, and long-ranging metal/oxide interface effects (with Y. Suchorski). This opened a new pathway to investigate catalyst heterogeneity and structure sensitivity, based on a 10-year research effort in developing the concepts of kinetics by imaging and surface structure and particle size libraries. Combining PEEM and DFT/microkinetics (with K.M. Neyman and H. Grönbeck) yielded fundamental insights on interface activity. PEEM was combined with SPEM (Scanning Photoelectron Microscopy) and recently extended to XPEEM and LEEM (low energy electron microscopy) in a true in situ correlative microscopy approach.

=== Single Particle Catalysis ===
Field electron microscopy (FEM) is applied to image an ongoing catalytic reaction on the facets of an individual metal nanocrystal in real time, enabling, e.g., to resolve interfacet coupling and its collapse due to surface restructuring. When the produced water was used as imaging species, the active sites were directly identified by in situ field ion microscopy (FIM). First observation of nano-chaos in a catalytic reaction and direct imaging of La-induced promotor effects.
