= Carbon Motors Corporation =

Defunct American automobile manufacturer that designed a purpose-built police car

- Type: Private
- Industry: Automotive
- Founded: 2003; 23 years ago
- Founders: Stacy Dean Stephens; William Santana Li
- Defunct: April 2013
- Fate: Closed
- Headquarters: Connersville, Indiana, U.S.
- Area served: United States
- Key people: William Santana Li (CEO)
- Products: E7 Police car
- Website: carbonmotors.com (archived)

The Carbon Motors Corporation was an American automobile manufacturer headquartered in Connersville, Indiana, United States. Formed in 2003, Carbon Motors was notable for designing the Carbon Motors E7, a purpose-built police car. After a government loan request failed, the company closed in 2013.

== History ==
Carbon Motors Corporation was founded in Los Angeles, California, by Stacy Dean Stephens and William Santana Li (a former police officer and former Ford executive, respectively) in 2003. Carbon Motors Corporation moved to Atlanta, Georgia in 2006, where it continued to develop its product and gain investors. In July 2009, the company relocated their headquarters to Connersville, Indiana, with plans to invest $350 million into converting a former Visteon plant there.

On March 22, 2010, Carbon Motors signed a contract with BMW for the delivery of 240,000 six-cylinder diesel engines.

On March 7, 2012, media reported that the United States Department of Energy (DOE) had denied a loan request of $310 million applied for under the Advanced Technology Vehicles Manufacturing Loan Program with Energy Secretary Steven Chu stating that while the DOE would have liked to approve the loan, there was "a responsibility to the taxpayers and they need to make sure it’s written in the statute that there's a reasonable chance of repayment." Carbon Motors officials had worked with the DOE over the prior two years to address concerns about Carbon Motors' plans. Carbon Motors criticized the DOE's reasons for refusing the loan as politically motivated and related to the 2012 elections. Another Indiana startup, Bright Automotive, was forced to end operations the week before after applying for the same loan in 2008 and being unable to continue waiting for the DOE to act on the application. On March 13, 2012, Secretary Chu testified before a Senate hearing partly related to claims made by Carbon Motors CEO William Santana Li regarding the politicization of loans granted by the DOE stating "Politics is not a factor, period. It has to do with the finances of the company, the viability of the loan."

In early March 2013, Carbon Motors began to remove equipment and vacate the plant in Connersville. The lease on the plant was allowed to expire on March 31, 2013. The company's website and YouTube channel were taken down around the same time. By April 2013, the company effectively shut down.

On May 22, 2013, three former Carbon Motors executives filed a lawsuit against the company for unpaid, deferred wages.

== Carbon Motors E7 ==
Carbon Motors was formed to develop and produce the E7, the first purpose-built police car ever made. The E7 was to be only available for law enforcement agencies to purchase. The prototype was first revealed in 2008 on the "Pure Justice" tour. The E7 had an expected release date of 2012. It was designed in part by American law enforcement officers for the sole purpose of producing a vehicle to be most effective to police. The company stated that, in order to keep the vehicle out of private ownership, when an agency wishes to dispose of an E7, it would either be sold to another law enforcement agency or returned to the factory to be parted out. The price was intended to be competitive considering the cost of equipping a conventional car for police work and how long each vehicle lasts. The Carbon E7 was to be built to last 250,000 miles, compared with 75,000 to 120,000 miles for the typical patrol car.

=== Specifications ===
The vehicle was to be equipped with a BMW straight-six turbo-diesel engine, which was more fuel efficient than contemporary gasoline engine police car engines. It was designed to be rear wheel drive, have a six-speed automatic transmission, be governed to a top speed of 155 mph, and accelerate from 0-60 mph in 6.5 seconds. It also featured numerous safety features, including 75 mph rear-impact crash capability, and optional ballistic protection panels. The vehicle also had law enforcement equipment designed into the vehicle intended to be installed during production so agencies would not need to purchase equipment from other companies and then install them on the vehicle. The front seats of the E7 were designed for comfort while wearing a duty belt.

=== Equipment ===
According to Carbon Motors Corporation, the E7 was to have numerous features and options available, including:

- NIJ Level III-A (or better) ballistic protection (front doors and dash panel)
- Purpose-designed seat for use with on-body equipment and seat heating and ventilation
- Head-up display
- Reverse backup camera
- Remote start capability
- Engine features to enable extended idling as well as operating in extreme conditions (heat and cold)
- Driver-specific intelligent key
- 360 degree exterior surveillance capability, with fully automatic recording
- Automatic number-plate recognition, programmable and upgradeable
- Video and audio surveillance of rear passenger compartment
- Nightvision compliant interior illumination
- Integrated forward looking infrared system (FLIR)
- Integrated shotgun and rifle mounts
- Secure weapons storage
- Optimized storage capability (compartment and cargo), to store police gear ranging from spare restraints to forensic equipment
- Integrated front and rear passenger compartment partition
- Isolated ventilation for front and rear compartments
- Rear seats designed to accommodate handcuffed suspects/prisoners
- Security features to prevent escape of prisoners
- Rear passenger compartment designed to be washed by hosing down
- Integrated push bumpers and PIT capability
- Integrated aerodynamic emergency lights with sirens

== Carbon Motors TX7 ==
The TX7 "Multi-Mission Vehicle" was a truck-based vehicle 272 in (6.9 m) long, 98 in (2.5 m) wide and 118 in (3 m) tall. It had seating for 10, and was designed for prisoner transport and personnel carrying. The engine was a turbo-diesel V8 coupled to a six-speed automatic transmission. The TX7 was priced at US$149,950, but only one prototype was built.

=== In popular culture ===
The Carbon E7 is featured in the 2010 video game Need for Speed: Hot Pursuit as one of the vehicles available for use when playing as a police officer. While most other playable vehicles (such as the Ford Crown Victoria, Dodge Charger, and other well-known vehicles) have performance statistics such as top speed listed, most of the E7's statistics are listed as "CLASSIFIED". However, the vehicle was removed from the remastered version of the game released in 2020 due to Carbon being defunct and the car never entering production.
