= Paul Ratnasamy =

Indian catalyst scientist

- Born: 11 June 1942 (age 84); Chennai, Tamil Nadu, India
- Education: Loyola College, Chennai
- Years active: since 1967
- Known for: Catalysis
- Children: Chandra Ratnasamy - Sylvia Ratnasamy (Elina Shrikande)
- Awards: Padma Shri; Shanti Swarup Bhatnagar Award; INSA Viswakarma Medal; VASVIK Industrial Research Award; TWAS TWNSO Award; International Zeolite Association Award; FICCI Award; Firodia Award; Om Prakash Bhasin Award; Bhangur Award; FIE Foundation Award; KG Naik Gold Medal, Life Time Achievement Award of the Petrotech Foundation

Paul Ratnasamy is an Indian catalyst scientist, INSA Srinivasa Ramanujan Research Professor and a former director of the National Chemical Laboratory of the Council of Scientific and Industrial Research (CSIR). He was honored by the Government of India in 2001 with the country's fourth-highest civilian awards, the Padma Shri.

== Biography ==
Paul Ratnasamy was born on 11 June 1942 in Chennai, in the Indian state of Tamil Nadu. He graduated (B.Sc.) in chemistry from Loyola College, Chennai in 1961 and continued his studies at the same institution to secure M.Sc. in 1963 and PhD on his thesis, Catalytic properties of alumina based materials in 1967. His postdoctoral research was at the Clarkson College of Technology, New York from 1967 to 1969 under the guidance of D. Rosenthal and moved to Belgium for further research as a research associate of J. J. Friplat at the Catholic University of Leuven where he stayed till 1972. His professional career started at the Indian Institute of Petroleum (IIP) in 1972 where he worked till 1979. During this period, he secured a post graduate diploma in Industrial Administration and Management from the British Institute of Commerce in 1975 and had a stint at LMU Munich as the Senior Humboldt Fellow under H. Knozinger. Ratnasamy joined National Chemical Laboratory (NCL) in 1980 as the Head of the Catalysis Division, got promoted in 1995 as the Director of the institution and retired from there in 2002. He also worked as the Professor of Biofuels at the J. B. Speed School of Engineering of University of Louisville for a period from 2009 till 2011.

== Achievements and positions ==
During his tenure as the director, NCL started the Catalysis Division as a dedicated facility for advanced research on the subject. His contributions are also reported in the establishment of the National Centre for Catalysis Research, Chennai.

Ratnasamy is credited with several scientific and technological innovations. The team at NCL, led by him, is reported to have developed six catalysts and catalytic processes in the discipline of zeolite catalysis. He is known to have proposed, with H. Knozinger as his associate, alumina surface models and, together with S. Sivasanker, models of Co-Mo-alumina hydrodesulfurisation catalyst which are considered as valid models. He is also credited with the synthesis and characterization of twelve molecular sieves.

Ratnasamy has developed and patented a catalytic method for the production of biofuel for jets from plant and animal triglycerides and fatty acids. The method deploys a technique where the hydrocarbons in the oils are unlocked by removing the oxygen and releasing it in the form of carbon dioxide, instead of in the form water, which requires the use of expensive hydrogen. This has been sourced by AliphaJet and marketed by them under the name, BoxCar™.

Paul Ratnasamy is the holder of 150 patents including 35 US patents and has published over 200 research papers in peer-reviewed international journals. He has served on the editorial boards of such international journals as Journal of Catalysis, Applied Catalysis, Catalysis Letters, Topics in Catalysis, Cattech, Zeolites and Microporous and Mesoporous Materials. He has attended many seminars and conferences and delivered keynote addresses on Catalysis and has served as a consultant to many global companies.

Ratnasamy is a former member of the council and the Ambassador at large of the International Zeolite Association during 2004-2006. He is a founder member and former president of the Indo-Pacific Catalysis Association. He is also a founder member of the Indian Catalysis Society and an Emeritus Theme Leader at the Conn Center.

== Awards and recognitions ==
Ratnasamy, an INSA Srinivasa Ramanujan Research Professor at National Catalyst Laboratory during 2004 to 2009, received the VASVIK Industrial Research Award from the Vividhlaxi Audyogik Samshodhan Vikas Kendra (VASVIK) in 1982. Two years later, he was awarded the Shanti Swarup Bhatnagar Prize in Engineering Sciences, in 1984. Maharaja Sayajirao University of Baroda, awarded him the K. G. Naik Gold Medal in 1989. He received the Om Prakash Bhasin Award in 1992, the TWAS technology award from the Third World Academy of Sciences and the Viswakarma Medal by the Indian National Science Academy (INSA), both in 1994. In 2001, the Government of India honored Ratnasamy with the Padma Shri, India's fourth-highest civilian award. The International Zeolite Association conferred on him their annual award in 2004. He is also a recipient of the Federation of Indian Chamber of Commerce and Industry Award, Firodia Award, Bhangur Award, FIE Foundation Award.

Catalysis Today, a peer reviewed journal, honoured Ratnasamy on his 70th birthday by dedicating their December 2012 issue to him. He is an elected Fellow of the Indian National Science Academy (INSA), the Third World Academy of Sciences, the National Academy of Sciences, India and the Indian National Academy of Engineering. Recently, the Petrotech Foundation had bestowed its Life Time Achievement Award (Category - R & D) for 2016 to Paul Ratnasamy.

== See also ==
- Clarkson University
- Katholieke Universiteit Leuven
