= Boryana Straubel =

Bulgarian businesswoman (1983–2021)

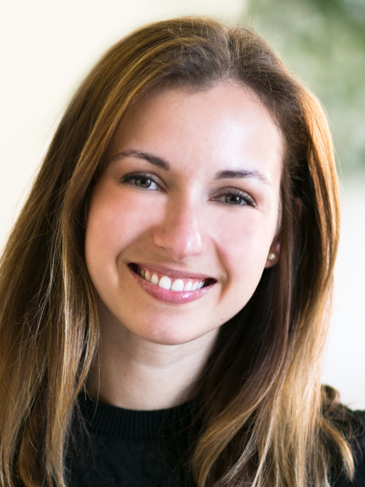
- Straubel in 2015
- Born: Boryana Dineva; May 25, 1983; Bulgaria
- Died: June 19, 2021 (aged 38); Washoe Valley, Nevada
- Education: College of San Mateo; University of California, Berkeley (BS); Stanford University (MSE, MBA)
- Spouse: J. B. Straubel (m. 2013)
- Website: straubelfoundation.org/thefounders

Boryana Dineva Straubel (May 25, 1983 – June 19, 2021) was a Bulgarian businesswoman and philanthropist who emigrated to the United States. She was a manager in human resources at Tesla, and married Tesla executive J. B. Straubel in 2013. In 2015, she became the vice president of human resources for the Wikimedia Foundation for one year. She was also the founder of a sustainable jewelry company called Generation Collection.

As she was bicycling in a designated lane in Nevada in June 2021, a car crossed the center line and struck her, killing her instantly.

== Early life and education ==
Boryana Dineva was born in Bulgaria. She was raised by a single mother. From a very young age, the value of hard work was instilled in her. She graduated from high school as class valedictorian in 2000.

After the fall of the Berlin Wall in 1989, her family migrated to Germany, where they lived in a refugee camp for a few months. Afterwards she lived in Austria and Russia. Straubel was passionate about math. She was shy and preferred surfing the internet rather than going out with friends. She moved to the United States in 2005. Straubel studied at the College of San Mateo and graduated in 2008. She studied at the University of California, Berkeley where she got a B.S. in Economics. In 2019 and 2020, she obtained a Management Science & Engineering Master's degree and an MBA at Stanford University.

== Career ==
Straubel worked as account manager for the software company Brocade until 2011. She joined Tesla in 2011 and stayed until 2015.

From 2015 to 2016, Straubel was VP of Human Resources for the Wikimedia Foundation. She oversaw the Wikimedia Foundation's talent and culture function, including talent acquisition, organizational training and development, and talent management and people analytics. She reported to Wikimedia Foundation Chief Operating Officer Terence Gilbey. She returned to Tesla after her work at the Wikimedia Foundation.

In 2021, she founded a jewelry company, Generation Collection, to promote environmental sustainability through the recycling of metals.

== Personal life and death ==
On August 3, 2013, Boryana Dineva Straubel married J. B. Straubel and lived in Woodside, California. In 2015, she gave birth to twins. When JB Straubel left as CTO at Tesla in July 2019, they moved to Nevada, where Redwood Materials was located.

Straubel died after being hit by a car which crossed a double yellow line on June 19, 2021, while Straubel was riding her bike. The driver of the car that killed her, Guadelupe Garcia-Davalos, was unlicensed and pleaded guilty to one count of reckless driving causing death or substantial bodily harm. The crime carried a maximum sentence of six years in prison. Garcia-Davalos was sentenced to two to six years in prison, and served just over two years, being released from parole on December 31, 2024.
