= Battery tester =

Electronic device intended for testing the state of an electric battery,

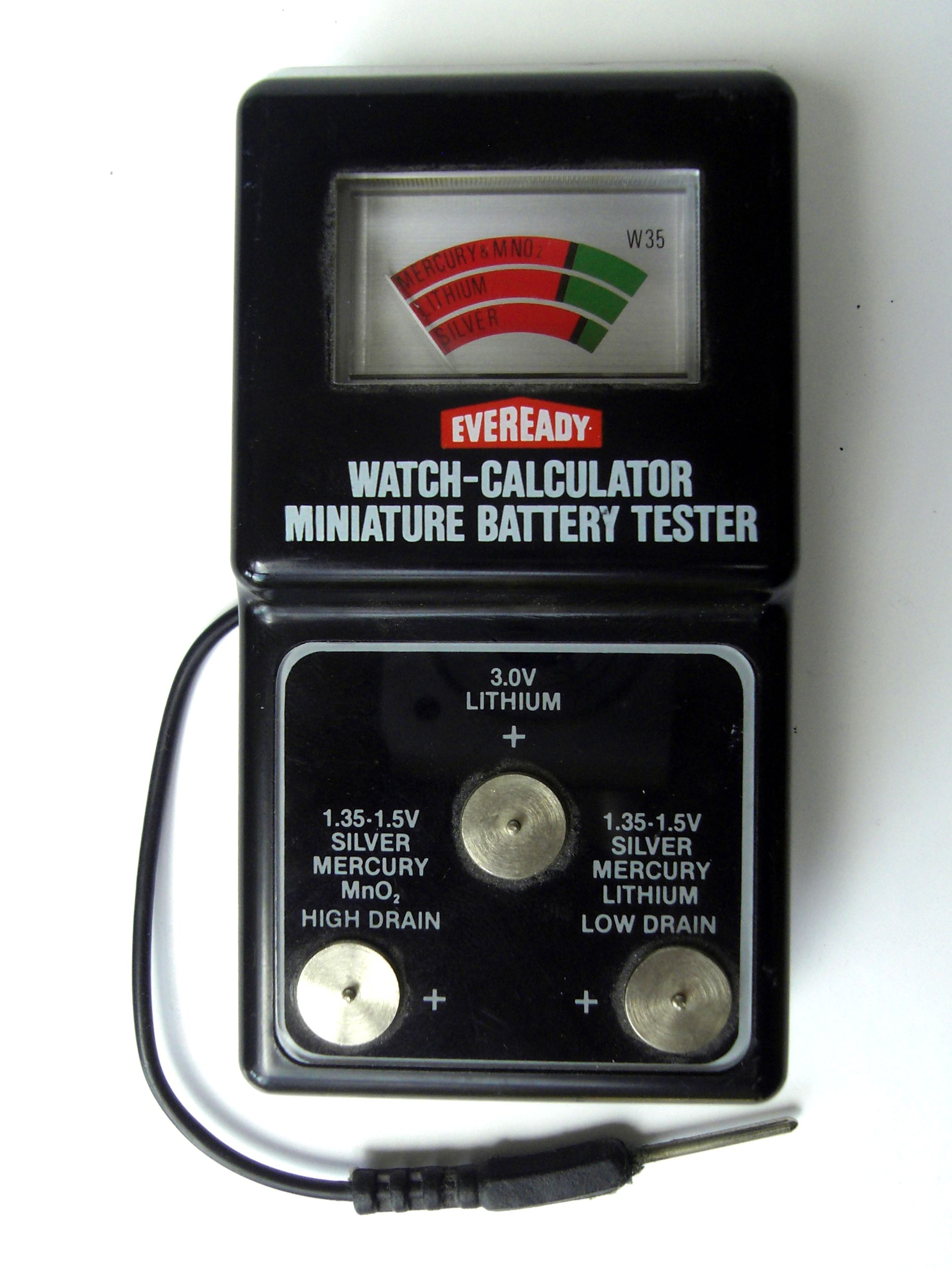
Battery tester

A battery tester is an electronic device intended for testing the state of an electric battery, going from a simple device for testing the charge actually present in the cells and/or its voltage output, to a more comprehensive testing of the battery's condition, namely its capacity for accumulating charge and any possible flaws affecting the battery's performance and security.

== Simple battery testers ==
The most simple battery tester is a DC ammeter, that indicates the battery's charge rate. DC voltmeters can be used to estimate the charge rate of a battery, provided that its nominal voltage is known.

== Integrated battery testers ==
There are many types of integrated battery testers, each one corresponding to a specific condition testing procedure, according to the type of battery being tested, such as the “421” test for lead-acid vehicle batteries. Their common principle is based on the empirical fact that after having applied a given current for a given number of seconds to the battery, the resulting voltage output is related to the battery's overall condition, when compared to a healthy battery's output.
