= J. B. Straubel =

American businessman (born 1975)

JB Straubel
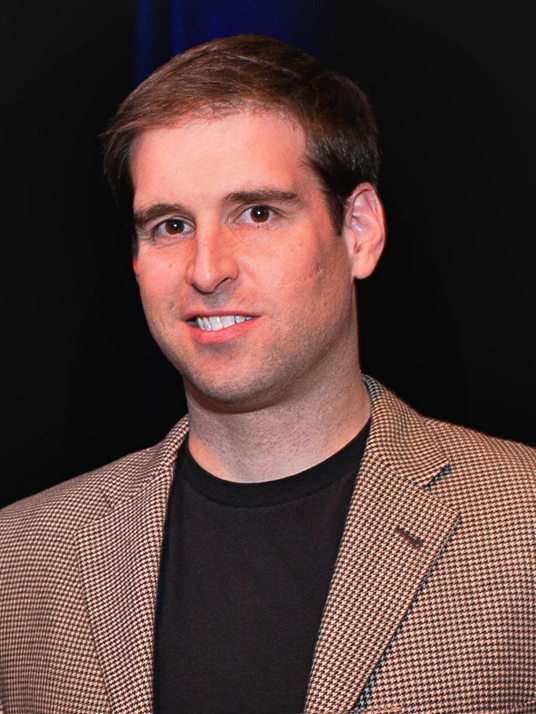
- Straubel in 2012
- Born: Jeffrey Brian Straubel; December 20, 1975 (age 50); Des Moines, Iowa, U.S.
- Education: Stanford University (BS, MS)
- Occupations: Businessman; technology executive; electrical engineer
- Years active: 2004–present
- Known for: CTO of Tesla, Inc.; founder & CEO of Redwood Materials, Inc.
- Board member of: Tesla, Inc.
- Spouse: Boryana Straubel (m. 2013; died 2021)
- Website: www.straubel.com

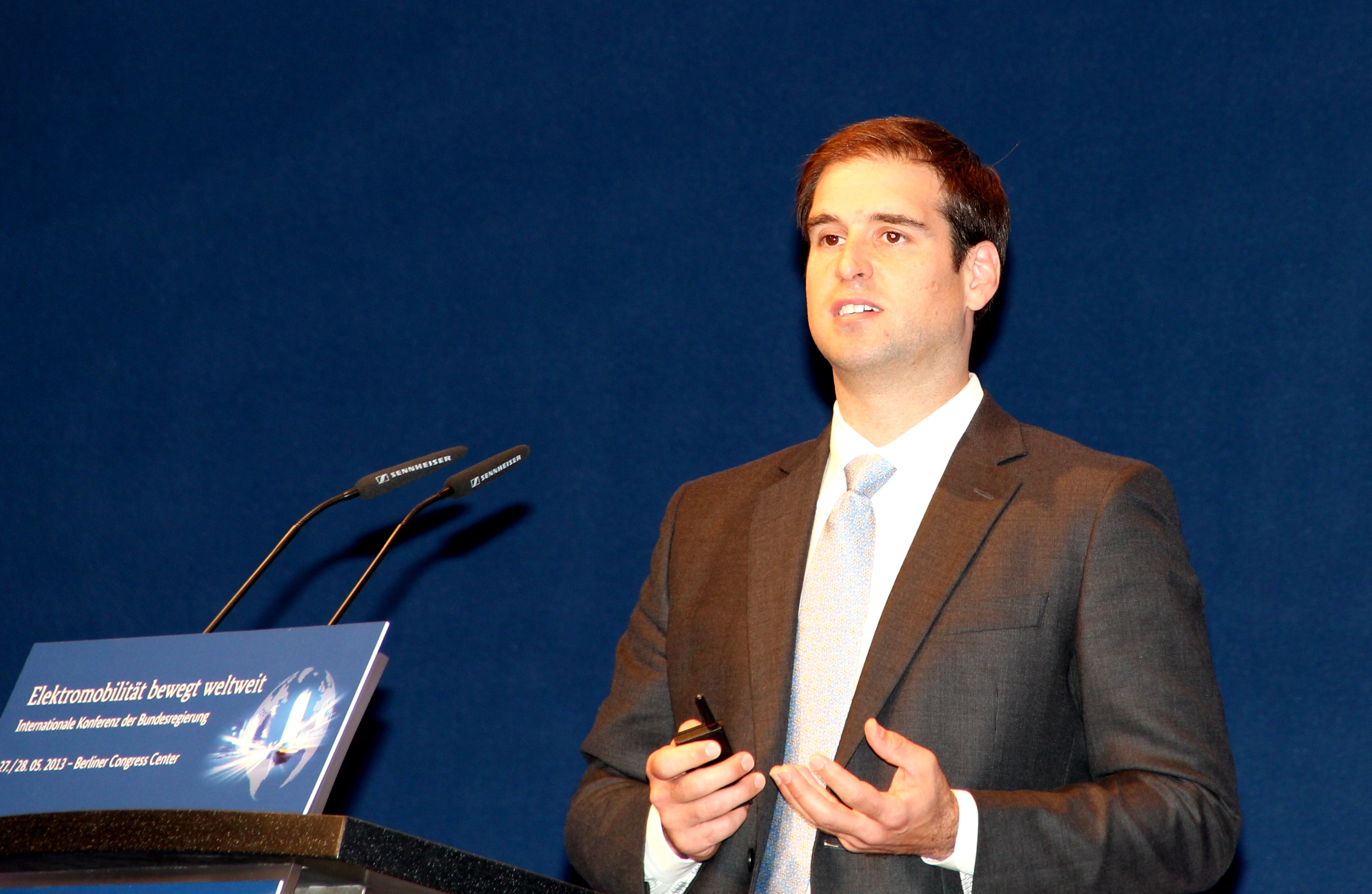
Jeffrey B. Straubel at the German Electromobility Summit 2013 in Berlin

Jeffrey Brian Straubel (/ˈstraʊbəl/; born December 20, 1975) is an American businessman and electrical engineer. He spent 15 years at Tesla, as chief technical officer until moving to an advisory role in July 2019. In 2023, he was elected to the company's board of directors.

In 2017, Straubel founded and became the CEO of Redwood Materials, Inc., working on creating battery materials and products for lithium-ion batteries out of recycled batteries.

== Early life and education ==
Straubel was born on December 20, 1975 in Des Moines, Iowa.

He holds a Bachelor of Science in energy systems engineering and a Master of Science in energy engineering from Stanford University.

== Career ==
Straubel joined Tesla as its fifth employee in 2004, and is named as a co-founder. He was its inaugural chief technical officer until moving to an advisory role in July 2019.

At Tesla, Straubel led battery cell design, supply chain and led the first Gigafactory concept through the production ramp of the Model 3. He had a direct role in research and development, team building, and operational expansion from prototype cars through to mass production and expanding battery production to gigawatt-hour scale. Straubel also had responsibility for new technology evaluation, technical due diligence review of key vendors and partners, intellectual property, and systems validation testing. In addition to his work at Tesla, Straubel was also on the board of directors at SolarCity. As the result of a court settlement, Straubel is legally considered to be a co-founder of Tesla.

He was also a lecturer at Stanford University for the 2015-2016 academic year, where he taught the energy storage integration classes (CEE 176C & CEE 276C) in the Atmosphere and Energy Program.

In 2017, Straubel established Redwood Materials, working on the recycling of lithium-ion batteries and e-waste.

Prior to Tesla, Straubel was the CTO and co-founder of Volacom along with Harold Rosen. Volacom worked closely with Burt Rutan at Scaled Composites to design a specialized high-altitude aircraft platform using a novel hydrogen-powered electric power plant. At Volacom, Straubel co-invented and patented a new long-endurance hybrid propulsion concept that was later licensed to Boeing.

In the area of technical expertise, Straubel has consulted with venture capital firms Taproot Ventures and Kleiner Perkins, in addition to several other private equity investors, to conduct technical due diligence reviews for many start-ups in the energy and sustainable energy technologies category. Straubel is on the board of QuantumScape and also consults with Amory Lovins at the Rocky Mountain Institute.

Although he did not originally intend to work in the automobile industry, Straubel has long had a passion for electric vehicles. He built an electric Porsche 944 that earned the 240 V SC/B world electric vehicle racing record in 2000.

Four years after leaving Tesla, Straubel was elected to its board as an independent director in May 2023.

== Personal life ==
On August 3, 2013, Straubel married Boryana Dineva and they lived in Woodside, California. In 2015 she gave birth to twins. When Straubel left as CTO at Tesla in July 2019, they moved to Nevada where Redwood Materials was located. She had worked as a manager in human resources at Tesla and was a vice president of human resources at the Wikimedia Foundation for one year.

On June 19, 2021, Boryana was killed while cycling in a designated bike lane in a rural area when a car crossed a double yellow line on Old Highway 395 in Washoe County, Nevada and hit her head-on. The driver was unlicensed.

== Public recognition ==
His photograph was taken in July 2006 driving Governor Arnold Schwarzenegger in the Tesla Roadster at its unveiling in Santa Monica, California.

Popular Science magazine featured Straubel in a full-length article in April 2007.

In September 2007, Straubel spoke on an energy panel titled "Clean, Secure, and Efficient Energy" at Stanford University along with former Secretary of State, George P. Shultz, where he emphasized the importance of education about climate change, and decreasing the CO_{2} intensity of our current energy production methods.

In early 2008, Stanford Magazine featured Straubel's role in growing the Stanford presence at Tesla.

Straubel was honored to keynote the Stanford Alumni EDAY in July 2008. Also in July 2008, Straubel spoke on a transportation panel "Progression Toward EVs" at Plug In 2008.

In 2008, Straubel was named Innovator of the Year by MIT's Technology Review in their annual TR35 innovators in the world under the age of 35. He spoke at MIT's Emtech conference on a panel on green transportation in Boston, MA in September 2008.

In March 2012, Straubel spoke at the DESIGN West conference, produced by UBM Electronics, at the McEnery Convention Center in San Jose, CA.

== Redwood Materials ==
Redwood Materials focuses on recovering valuable materials such as lithium, cobalt, and nickel from used lithium-ion batteries and manufacturing scrap so that these materials can be reused to produce new batteries. The company aims to reduce waste and support a more sustainable battery supply chain.

Redwood Materials is a company established in Nevada by Straubel in 2017, to recycle lithium-ion automotive battery packs on a large scale. As of August 2020, the company had been operating in stealth mode as the technologies and processes were developed to enable the company to begin operation in the early 2020s.

On August 29, 2020, Straubel was interviewed by The Wall Street Journal and revealed additional details:

- Redwood Materials is inventing sustainable materials by creating circular supply chains, turning waste into profit and solving the environmental impacts of new products before they happen.
- In 2019, Panasonic, Tesla's battery partner, began a partnership with Redwood to reclaim the scrap it generates in making battery cells: all of the scrap coming from Panasonic’s side of the Nevada Tesla Gigafactory is now shipped to Redwood.
- In 2020, Redwood closed its first fundraising round with $40 million raised from Capricorn Investment Group and Breakthrough Energy Ventures, an environmental investment fund that includes Amazon.com Inc. founder Jeff Bezos and Microsoft Corp. co-founder Bill Gates.
- As part of Amazon’s continued commitment to The Climate Pledge, a $2 billion venture investment program to back companies building technologies, products and services that will help Amazon and other companies accelerate the path to net-zero carbon, received an investment. Redwood will be able to offer Amazon and other companies sustainable ways to recycle batteries, electronics and other end of life products through environmentally-sound processing and refining technologies that create a sustainable, circular supply chain. Redwood Materials will also help Amazon properly recycle EV and other lithium-ion batteries and e-waste from other parts of Amazon’s businesses and reuse their components.
- In July 2021, Redwood Materials had more than 130 employees.
- Straubel hopes that within 10 years recycling will bring the price of raw materials for lithium ion batteries down to about half of what it costs to mine virgin material.

In June 2021, Redwood announced plans to expand its Carson City, Nevada facility to 550,000 square feet. Plans were also revealed to build another facility at the Tahoe-Reno Industrial Center and to recruit 500 more employees.

In July 2021, Redwood raised $775 million from investors and venture firms. Investment management group T. Rowe Price Associates led a Series C round of funding that included Goldman Sachs Asset Management, Baillie Gifford, Canada Pension Plan Investment Board, Fidelity, Valor Equity Partners, Emerson Collective and Franklin Templeton. Capricorn’s Technology Impact Fund, Bill Gates’ Breakthrough Energy Ventures and Amazon’s Climate Pledge Fund also returned to invest additional capital.
