= Electra Battery Materials =

Canadian multinational corporation

Electra Battery Materials Corporation
- Traded as: Nasdaq: ELBM; TSX-V: ELBM
- Industry: Metals and mining
- Founded: March 2017, as First Cobalt Corp.
- Headquarters: Toronto, Ontario, Canada
- Area served: North America
- Key people: Trent Mell, CEO
- Website: https://electrabmc.com

Electra Battery Materials Corporation (EBMC, formerly First Cobalt Corp.) is a Canadian multinational corporation engaged in mining and refining raw materials for electric batteries. Electra owns and operates the first fully permitted metallurgical refinery in North America for producing battery-grade cobalt and nickel sulfate near Cobalt, Ontario. The company also owns the Iron Creek cobalt-copper deposit in Lemhi County, Idaho, US.

== History ==
Cobalt has historically been obtained as a byproduct of copper and nickel mining. The electric vehicle boom in the 2010s created an increased demand for cobalt as a component of electric batteries. In response to that, Electra (First Cobalt Corporation at the time) emerged as a pure-play cobalt exploration and mining company in 2017. The company completed a three way merger with CobalTech Mining Inc. and Cobalt One Ltd to consolidate its ownership of cobalt assets in the Ontario cobalt camp.

First Cobalt acquired junior explorer US Cobalt in 2018 and took ownership of its Iron Creek cobalt-copper project. The Iron Creek deposit is located in the Idaho Cobalt Belt, which is the second largest known source of cobalt in the United States. In a 2019 estimate, First Cobalt defined an indicated resource of 6000 tons of cobalt and 13,000 tons of copper contained in this deposit. By 2021, the company doubled its land position surrounding the Iron Creek project.

In late 2021, the company announced the creation of Electra Battery Materials Park at its Ontario refinery site, with the addition of a recycling plant for expired Lithium-ion batteries. Soon after, the company changed its name to Electra Battery Materials to reflect the strategic shift from being a pure-play cobalt miner toward refining and recycling a wider variety of battery materials. In June 2022, Electra started preliminary discussions with the Quebec government to build a second cobalt refinery in the Bécancour Industrial Park.

In December 2022, Electra launched a black mass (shredded remains of Li-ion batteries) recycling trial and demonstrated capability to extract lithium, nickel, cobalt, manganese, copper, and graphite at scale.

In August 2024, the United States Department of Defense announced a US$20 million award to Electra for the completion of the Ontario refinery and to start production of cobalt sulfate.

In June 2026, the plant located near Cobalt, Ontario was to be operational at the end of 2027 would eventually have a capacity of 6,500 tonnes of battery-grade cobalt.

== See also ==
- Battery recycling
- Redwood Materials inc.
