= Advanced Technology Vehicles Manufacturing Loan Program =

U.S. loan program

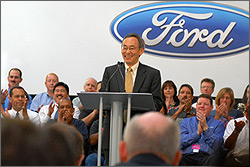
Energy Secretary Chu announced the loans to Ford employees in Detroit.

Advanced Technology Vehicles Manufacturing (ATVM) Loan Program is a $25 billion direct loan program funded by Congress in fall 2008 to provide debt capital to the U.S. automotive industry for the purpose of funding projects that help vehicles manufactured in the U.S. meet higher mileage requirements and lessen U.S. dependence on foreign oil. Of the 108 requests made, 5 were approved to receive $8.4 billion, with the majority of that amount under repayment.

== Background and criteria ==
The loan program was authorized under section 136 of the Energy Independence and Security Act of 2007, which provided the program with $25 billion in loan authority, supported by a $7.5 billion appropriation to fund the credit subsidy, or the 30% risk profile expected for projects of this type. To qualify, automakers and eligible component manufacturers must promise to increase the fuel economy of their products by 25% over the average fuel economy of similar 2005 models, and apply the loans to future investments "reasonably related to the reequipping, expanding, or establishing a manufacturing facility in the U.S." In distributing the loans the DOE may decide which technologies it believes are most promising and deserving of assistance. Loan recipients must also be "financially viable" for the length of the loan. Given 60 days by congressional statute to issue an interim final rule, the Department of Energy (DOE), responsible for overseeing the program, finalized the rule 36 days later on November 5, 2008 (compared to 18 months usually needed for such rule making). This program is unrelated to the United States Treasury Department's Troubled Asset Relief Program (TARP) which has been providing bailout funding to two of the big three U.S. automakers to reduce the effects of the 2008–10 automotive industry crisis on the United States. The two programs were enacted during the Automotive industry crisis of 2008–10, but with different purposes.

It has been speculated that at least two of the Big Three U.S. automobile manufacturers may not be able to qualify for this program because of its fuel economy and financial solvency requirements.

In November 2008, the auto industry began lobbying for the $25 billion to be loaned immediately, as well as another $25 billion to be loaned later to cover retirees health care costs.

As originally worded, the program was applicable only to four-wheeled passenger vehicles. In October 2009, a bill sponsored by California Representatives Brian Bilbray and Adam Schiff was passed extending the program's coverage to include high mileage (equivalent to 75 mpg_{‑US} or 3.1 L/100 km or 90 mpg_{‑imp} ) two- and three-wheeled vehicles.

== DOE's Alternative Vehicle Technologies Awards ==
The U.S. Department of Energy (DOE) announced in December 2008 the selection of six cost-shared research projects for the development and demonstration of alternative vehicle technology projects totaling a DOE investment of up to $14.55 million over three years, subject to annual appropriations. Private sector contributions will further increase the financial investment for a total of up to $29.3 million. The selections announced are part of DOE's continuing work to develop high efficiency vehicle technologies and are not part of the recently announced $25 billion Advanced Technology Vehicles Manufacturing Loan Program. These projects were selected under three diverse topic areas: lithium-ion battery materials and manufacturing (3M Company for developing advanced anode; BASF Catalyst for domestic production of low cost cathode materials and FMC Corporation for scaling up production of stabilized lithium metal powder for high energy cathodes); thermoelectric heating, ventilation and air conditioning (TE HVAC system); and aerodynamic heavy-duty truck trailers (Navistar International Corporation).

== Conditional loans ==
=== Overview ===
ATVM budget
1. $5,907 M September 2009: Ford (24.0%)
2. $1,448 M January 2010: Nissan (6.00%)
3. $529 M April 2010: Fisker (2.00%)
4. $465 M January 2010: Tesla (2.00%)
5. $50 M March 2011: Vehicle Production Group (1.00%)
6. $16,600 M 2015: Remaining authority (66.0%)

USDOE announced in 2009 $8.4 billion in conditional loan agreements for Ford Motor Company; Nissan North America, Inc.; Tesla Motors, Inc. and Fisker Automotive to fund the development of advanced vehicle technologies. Additionally, DOE has spent approximately $3.3 billion on federal credit subsidies costs in order to secure the loans for the few approved companies. The loan commitments include a $5.9 billion loan to Ford for upgrading factories in five states to produce 13 more fuel-efficient models, a $1.6 billion loan to Nissan to build advanced electric vehicles and advanced batteries, and a $465 million loan to Tesla Motors to manufacture its new electric sedan. These are the first conditional loans released under DOE's Advanced Technology Vehicles Manufacturing (ATVM) Loan Program, which is using an open, competitive process to provide about $25 billion in loans to companies that produce cars or vehicle components in the United States. To qualify, companies must propose projects that increase fuel economy to at least 25% above 2005 fuel economy levels. By 2014, Ford and Nissan were making payments, while Tesla paid back the loan in 2013. Nissan eventually repaid the loan in 2017. The program has earned the government nearly $3 billion in interest. The program had not issued new loans since 2011, and six applicants were seeking around $12 billion of loans in early 2020. The federal government has considered shutting down the program under the Trump Administration. As of February 2023, the department was analyzing 126 proposals for loans totaling $126 billion.

=== Ford ===
Ford Motor Company received its loan in September 2009, the funds were used to upgrade its engine plants in Dearborn, Michigan; Cleveland, Ohio; and Lima, Ohio, and to upgrade its transmission plants in Livonia, Michigan; Sterling Heights, Michigan; and Sharonville, Ohio. Ford also upgraded its assembly plants in Chicago, Illinois; Louisville, Kentucky; Dearborn, Michigan; Wayne, Michigan; and Kansas City, Missouri, converting two of the truck factories into assembly plants for cars. In addition, the loan financed advances in traditional combustion engines and electrified vehicles and helped raise the fuel efficiency of more than two dozen popular models. The V6 EcoBoost engine benefited from the loan, and is installed in many cars as well as over 500,000 F-150, saving 268 million gallons of gasoline by 2014. The loan was fully repaid($5.9 billion including interest) in June 2022.

In 2023, the Program approved a $9.2 billion loan for Blue Oval City, a battery plant by Ford and SK Innovation.

=== Nissan ===
Nissan aims to manufacture a cost-competitive electric vehicle with a lithium-ion battery pack in Smyrna, Tennessee, and plans to eventually reach a production capacity of 150,000 vehicles per year. The Nissan Leaf is produced at Nissan's Smyrna assembly plant since 2013, along with cells for its batteries. Nissan repaid the loan in 2017.

=== Tesla ===
Tesla Motors will use its funding (US$465 million) to finance a California-based manufacturing facility for the Tesla Model S sedan, an all-electric sedan that can be recharged at a conventional 120-volt or 240-volt outlet. Production will begin in 2011 and ramp up to 20,000 vehicles per year by the end of 2013. Tesla repaid the loan in May 2013, and was the first car company to have fully repaid the government, while Ford, Nissan and Fisker had not up to that moment.

=== Fisker Automotive ===
The fourth conditional commitment that the Department of Energy has entered into under the ATVM Loan program is a $528.7 million loan for Fisker Automotive for the development of two lines of plug-in hybrids by 2016. Fisker received $192 million, before losing access to the rest of the loan. Fisker later defaulted once the company began to suffer from financial issues. In 2013, the company declared voluntary bankruptcy. The DOE would ultimately reclaim $28 million from Fisker for a total of $53 million recovered of its $192 million loan. The money came from a three-day auction in which Chinese auto parts supplier Wanxiang Group received court approval on February 18, 2014, to buy the assets of Fisker with a bid of $149.2 million against a rival bid from Hong Kong billionaire Richard Li.

=== Syrah Technologies ===
In 2022, the program granted $107 million to Syrah Technologies to assist its graphite-based active anode material Vidalia Facility in Louisiana. The grant was the first in over 10 years.

=== Ultium Cells LLC ===
The joint venture of General Motors and LG Energy Solution, Ultium Cells LLC, won a $2.5 billion loan in December 2022. The company intends to use the loan towards setting up three US factories in the states of Ohio, Tennessee, and Michigan, to make its lithium-ion battery systems.

=== Redwood Materials ===
Redwood Materials secured a $2 billion conditional loan in February 2023. The company which relies primarily on Asia for importing essential components to make EV batteries said it would use the funds to build a supply base in the US and expand operations by building a facility in Charleston, South Carolina.

== Unsuccessful applications ==
About 108 requests were made to the program by 2010, but few were approved. Many of the companies which were denied loans have since gone out of business. Among the applicants denied were:

- A loan request under this program was denied for Carbon Motors Corporation in March 2012 after the latter had spent 2 years prior addressing the DOE's concerns.
- Aptera Motors' initial application was denied because its product was a three-wheeled vehicle; the wording on the program was modified to allow high-mileage three-wheelers and Aptera reapplied, however the company went out of business before the DOE responded to their second application.
- Brammo asked for $45 million, application was rejected.
- Local Motors' Local Motors initial application (filed in 2009) was rejected, company said to be working on resubmission.
- Bright Automotive, who filed their application in 2008, went out of business in March 2012 after waiting 4 years for the DOE to respond and being unable to sustain continued operations.
- Coda Automotive, ultimately went into Chapter 11 bankruptcy on May 1, 2013.
- XP Vehicles - sued the U.S. Department of Energy
