= Call2Recycle =

- Founded: 1994
- Type: Non-profit public service organization
- Location: Headquarters: Atlanta, GA, USA
- Region served: Canada United States
- Key people: Leo Raudys (CEO); Elyssa Bailey (CAO); Lisa Fleming (CFO); Todd Ellis (Managing Director, Services & Solutions); Eric Frederickson (VP, Operations); Linda Gabor (EVP, External Relations)
- Employees: 20-40
- Website: https://www.call2recycle.org/, https://call2recycle.ca/

Call2Recycle, a not-for-profit organization, is a battery recycling program, active in the USA and Canada.

On January 13th, 2026, the organization rebranded as The Battery Network to reflect the evolution of the program's expanded scope.

== See also ==
- Electronic waste
- Recycling in the United States
