= Redwood Materials =

American battery-recycling company

Redwood Materials, Inc.
- Type: Private
- Industry: Li-ion batteries; Renewable energy
- Founded: 2017; 9 years ago
- Founder: J. B. Straubel
- Headquarters: Carson City, Nevada, United States
- Key people: J. B. Straubel (CEO)
- Revenue: US$200 million (2024)
- Number of employees: 1,100 (2025)
- Website: redwoodmaterials.com

Redwood Materials, Inc. is an American company headquartered in Carson City, Nevada. The company aims to recycle lithium-ion batteries and produce battery materials for electromobility and electrical storage systems. Founded in 2017 by J. B. Straubel, Redwood Materials was reported to have a valuation of about $6 billion as of October 2025.

== History ==
While at Tesla, Straubel was part of the company’s founding technical team and contributed to the development of its early battery architecture and power electronics systems. According to Ashlee Vance’s biography Elon Musk: Tesla, SpaceX, and the Quest for a Fantastic Future (2015), Straubel played a key role in shaping Tesla’s engineering direction, including work that later informed the Gigafactory project for large-scale battery production. Redwood Materials was founded in 2017 by J. B. Straubel, who was a co-founder and served as chief technology officer at Tesla, Inc. for 16 years. Redwood set out to create a circular supply chain for electric vehicles and clean energy products, making them more sustainable long term and driving down the cost for batteries by developing a fully closed loop for lithium-ion batteries. Redwood sought to recycle batteries, recapturing valuable materials to help make new batteries.

On its website in 2022 Redwood Materials explained that the company received enough end-of-life batteries annually to provide critical materials for new batteries for about 60,000 new electric vehicles. Redwood estimated that it was recovering more than 95% of the metals (including nickel, cobalt, lithium, and copper) from end-of-life batteries.

Redwood then produces strategic battery materials, supplying battery manufacturing partners with anode copper foil and cathode active materials.

Redwood is partnered with companies such as Panasonic, Ford Motor Company, and Amazon.

Along with Ford and Volvo, Redwood Materials launched a used battery collection program for the state of California in February of 2022. Ford, Volvo and their dealers planned to work with battery dismantlers and ship old vehicle batteries to Redwood Material's plant in Carson City, Nevada. Redwood builds and operates a used battery as solar backup for a datacenter at its Sparks facility.

In 2021, the company announced it had received $700M from various investors in a financing round at a $3.7 billion valuation. This will be used to build a production facility that will produce battery materials from recycled materials, starting at 6 GWh per year. By 2025, the capacity of the production facilities is to be expanded to 100 GWh, enough for one million electric vehicles. By 2030, capacity is expected to increase to 500 GWh.

Redwood secured a $2 billion conditional low-cost loan awarded by the US Department of Energy's Advanced Technology Vehicles Manufacturing Loan Program in February 2023. The company which relies primarily on Asia for importing essential components to make EV batteries said it would use the funds to build a supply base in the US and expand operations by building a facility in Charleston, South Carolina. Redwood acquired German recycling company Redux in 2023.

In March 2023 Redwood claimed to have recovered more than 95% of important metals (incl. lithium, cobalt, nickel and copper) from 500,000 lb (230,000 kg) of old NiMH and Li-Ion packs.

In January 2024, Redwood broke ground on a new $3.5 billion battery factory in South Carolina, claiming the factory will use 100% electric operations and 0% fossil fuel use in its process when operational. In May 2024, Redwood was listed by Time magazine as one of the 100 most influential companies in 2024.

== Investors ==
Investors in Redwood Materials' $700M Series C include T. Rowe Price, Goldman Sachs, Baillie Gifford, Fidelity, Ford Motor Company and Amazon's Climate Pledge Fund.

Investors in Redwood Materials' $350M Series E include Eclipse Capital, Google, and NVidia's NVentures.

== See also ==
- Electra Battery Materials
- American Battery Technology Company
