= Operando spectroscopy =

Analytical methodology in spectroscopy

Operando spectroscopy is an analytical methodology wherein the spectroscopic characterization of materials undergoing reaction is coupled simultaneously with measurement of catalytic activity and selectivity. The primary concern of this methodology is to establish structure–reactivity/selectivity relationships of catalysts and thereby yield information about mechanisms. Other uses include those in engineering improvements to existing catalytic materials and processes and in developing new ones.

== Overview and terms ==
In the context of organometallic catalysis, an in situ reaction involves the real-time measurement of a catalytic process using techniques such as mass spectrometry, NMR, infrared spectroscopy, and gas chromatography to help gain insight into functionality of the catalyst.

Approximately 90% of industrial precursor chemicals are synthesized using catalysts. Understanding the catalytic mechanism and active site is crucial to creating catalysts with optimal efficiency and maximal product yield.

In situ reactor cell designs typically are incapable of pressure and temperature consistency required for true catalytic reaction studies, making these cells insufficient. Several spectroscopic techniques require liquid helium temperatures, making them inappropriate for real-world studies of catalytic processes. Therefore, the operando reaction method must involve in situ spectroscopic measurement techniques, but under true catalytic kinetic conditions.

Operando (Latin for working) spectroscopy refers to continuous spectra collection of a working catalyst, allowing for simultaneous evaluation of both structure and activity/selectivity of the catalyst.

== History ==
The term operando first appeared in catalytic literature in 2002. It was coined by Miguel A. Bañares, who sought to name the methodology in a way that captured the idea of observing a functional material – in this case a catalyst – under actual working, i.e. device operation, conditions. The first international congress on operando spectroscopy took place in Lunteren, Netherlands, in March 2003, followed by further conferences in 2006 (Toledo, Spain), 2009 (Rostock, Germany), 2012 (Brookhaven, USA), and 2015 (Deauville, France). The name change from in situ to operando for the research field of spectroscopy of catalysts under working conditions was proposed at the Lunteren congress.

The analytical principle of measuring the structure, property and function of a material, a component disassembled or as part of a device simultaneously under operation conditions is not restricted to catalysis and catalysts. Batteries and fuel cells have been subject to operando studies with respect to their electrochemical function.

== Methodology ==
Operando spectroscopy is a class of methodology, rather than a specific spectroscopic technique such as FTIR or NMR. Operando spectroscopy is a logical technological progress in situ studies. Catalyst scientists would ideally like to have a "motion picture" of each catalytic cycle, whereby the precise bond-making or bond-breaking events taking place at the active site are known; this would allow a visual model of the mechanism to be constructed. The ultimate goal is to determine the structure-activity relationship of the substrate-catalyst species of the same reaction. Having two experiments—the performing of a reaction plus the real-time spectral acquisition of the reaction mixture—on a single reaction facilitates a direct link between the structures of the catalyst and intermediates, and of the catalytic activity/selectivity. Although monitoring a catalytic process in situ can provide information relevant to catalytic function, it is difficult to establish a perfect correlation because of the current physical limitations of in situ reactor cells. Complications arise, for example, for gas phase reactions which require large void volumes, which make it difficult to homogenize heat and mass within the cell. The crux of a successful operando methodology, therefore, is related to the disparity between laboratory setups and industrial setups, i.e., the limitations of properly simulating the catalytic system as it proceeds in industry.

The purpose of operando spectroscopy is to measure the catalytic changes that occur within the reactor during operation using time-resolved (and sometimes spatially-resolved) spectroscopy. Time-resolved spectroscopy theoretically monitor the formation and disappearance of intermediate species at the active site of the catalyst as bond are made and broken in real time. However, current operando instrumentation often only works in the second or subsecond time scale and therefore, only relative concentrations of intermediates can be assessed. Spatially resolved spectroscopy combines spectroscopy with microscopy to determine active sites of the catalyst studied and spectator species present in the reaction.

=== Cell design ===
Operando spectroscopy requires measurement of the catalyst under (ideally) real working conditions, involving comparable temperature and pressure environments to those of industrially catalyzed reactions, but with a spectroscopic device inserted into the reaction vessel. The parameters of the reaction are then measured continuously during the reaction using the appropriate instrumentation, i.e., online mass spectrometry, gas chromatography or IR/NMR spectroscopy.

Operando instruments (in situ cells) must ideally allow for spectroscopic measurement under optimal reaction conditions. Most industrial catalysis reactions require excessive pressure and temperature conditions which subsequently degrades the quality of the spectra by lowering the resolution of signals. Currently many complications of this technique arise due to the reaction parameters and the cell design. The catalyst may interact with the components of the operando apparatus; open space in the cell can have an effect on the absorption spectra, and the presence of spectator species in the reaction may complicate analysis of the spectra. Continuing development of operando reaction-cell design is in line with working towards minimizing the need for compromise between optimal catalysis conditions and spectroscopy. These reactors must handle specific temperature and pressure requirements while still providing access for spectrometry.

Other requirements considered when designing operando experiments include reagent and product flow rates, catalyst position, beam paths, and window positions and sizes. All of these factors must also be accounted for while designing operando experiments, as the spectroscopic techniques used may alter the reaction conditions. An example of this was reported by Tinnemans et al., which noted that local heating by a Raman laser can give spot temperatures exceeding 100 °C. Also, Meunier reports that when using DRIFTS, there is a noticeable temperature difference (on the order of hundreds of degrees) between the crucible core and the exposed surface of the catalyst due to losses caused by the IR-transparent windows necessary for analysis.

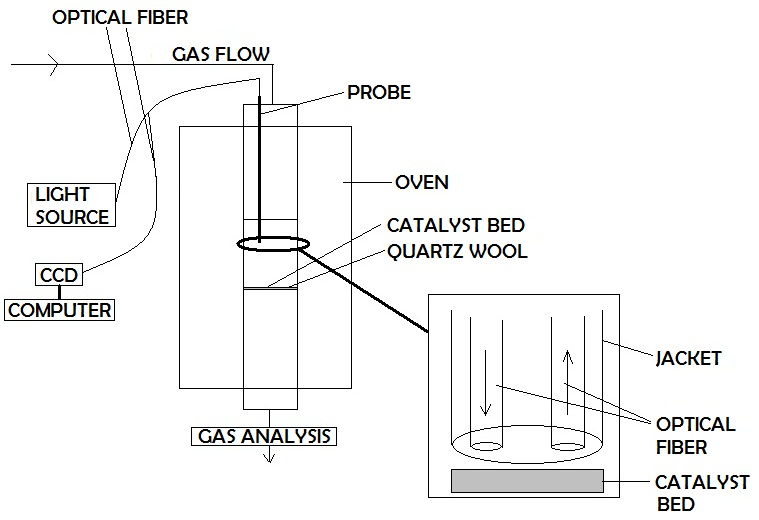
Operando apparatus for heterogeneous catalysis

==== Raman spectroscopy ====
Raman spectroscopy is one of the easiest methods to integrate into a heterogeneous operando experiment, as these reactions typically occur in the gas phase, so there is very low litter interference and good data can be obtained for the species on the catalytic surface. In order to use Raman, all that is required is to insert a small probe containing two optical fibers for excitation and detection. Pressure and heat complications are essentially negligible, due to the nature of the probe. Operando confocal Raman micro-spectroscopy has been applied to the study of fuel cell catalytic layers with flowing reactant streams and controlled temperature.

==== UV-vis spectroscopy ====
Operando UV-vis spectroscopy is particularly useful for many homogeneous catalytic reactions because organometallic species are often colored. Fiber-optical sensors allow monitoring of the consumption of reactants and production of product within the solution through absorption spectra. Gas consumption as well as pH and electrical conductivity can also be measured using fiber-optic sensors within an operando apparatus.

==== IR spectroscopy ====
One case study investigated the formation of gaseous intermediates in the decomposition of CCl_{4} in the presence of steam over La_{2}O_{3} using Fourier-transform infrared spectroscopy. This experiment produced useful information about the reaction mechanism, active site orientation, and about which species compete for the active site.

==== X-ray diffraction ====
A case study by Beale et al. involved preparation of iron phosphates and bismuth molybdate catalysts from an amorphous precursor gel. The study found that there were no intermediate phases in the reaction, and helped to determine kinetic and structural information. The article uses the dated term in-situ, but the experiment uses, in essence, an operando method. Although x-ray diffraction does not count as a spectroscopy method, it is often being used as an operando method in various fields, including catalysis.

==== X-ray spectroscopy ====
X-ray spectroscopy methods can be used for genuine operando analyses of catalysts and other functional materials. The redox dynamics of sulfur with Ni/GDC anode during solid oxide fuel cell (SOFC) operation at mid- and low-range temperatures in an operando S K-edge XANES have been studied. Ni is a typical catalyst material for the anode in high temperature SOFCs. The operando spectro-electrochemical cell for this high temperature gas-solid reaction study under electrochemical conditions was based on a typical high temperature heterogeneous catalysis cell, which was further equipped with electric terminals.

Very early method development for operando studies on PEM-FC fuel cells was done by Haubold et al. at Forschungszentrum Jülich and HASYLAB. Specifically they developed plexiglas spectro-electrochemical cells for XANES, EXAFS and SAXS and ASAXS studies with control of the electrochemical potential of the fuel cell. Under operation of the fuel cell they determined the change of the particle size of and oxidation state and shell formation of the platinum electrocatalyst. In contrast to the SOFC operation conditions, this was a PEM-FC study in liquid environment under ambient temperature.

The same operando method is applied to battery research and yields information on the changes of the oxidation state of electrochemically active elements in a cathode such as Mn via XANES, information on coronation shell and bond length via EXAFS, and information on microstructure changes during battery operation via ASAXS. Since lithium-ion batteries are intercalation batteries, information on the chemistry and electronic structure going on in the bulk during operation are of interest. For this, soft x-ray information can be obtained using hard X-ray Raman scattering.

Fixed energy methods (FEXRAV) have been developed and applied to the study of the catalytic cycle for the oxygen evolution reaction on iridium oxide. FEXRAV consists of recording the absorption coefficient at a fixed energy while varying at will the electrode potential in an electrochemical cell during the course of an electrochemical reaction. It allows to obtain a rapid screening of several systems under different experimental conditions (e.g., nature of the electrolyte, potential window), preliminary to deeper XAS experiments.

The soft X-Ray regime (i.e. with photon energy < 1000 eV) can be profitably used for investigating heterogeneous solid-gas reaction. In this case, it is proved that XAS can be sensitive both to the gas phase and to the solid surface states.

==== Gas chromatography ====
One case study monitored the dehydrogenation of propane to propene using micro-GC. Reproducibility for the experiment was high. The study found that the catalyst (Cr/Al_{2}O_{3}) activity increased to a sustained maximum of 10% after 28 minutes — an industrially useful insight into the working stability of a catalyst.

==== Mass spectrometry ====
Use of mass spectrometry as a second component of an operando experiment allows for optical spectra to be obtained before obtaining a mass spectrum of the analytes. Electrospray ionization allows a wider range of substances to be analysed than other ionization methods, due to its ability to ionize samples without thermal degradation. In 2017, Prof. Frank Crespilho and coworks introduced a new approach to operando DEMS, aiming the enzyme activity evaluation by differential electrochemical mass spectrometry (DEMS). NAD-dependent alcohol dehydrogenase (ADH) enzymes for ethanol oxidation were investigated by DEMS. The broad mass spectra obtained under bioelectrochemical control and with unprecedented accuracy were used to provide new insight into the enzyme kinetics and mechanisms.

== Applications ==
=== Nanotechnology ===
Operando spectroscopy has become a vital tool for surface chemistry. Nanotechnology, used in materials science, involves active catalytic sites on a reagent surface with at least one dimension in the nano-scale of approximately 1–100 nm. As particle size decreases, surface area increases. This results in a more reactive catalytic surface. The reduced scale of these reactions affords several opportunities while presenting unique challenges; for example, due to the very small size of the crystals (sometimes <5 nm), any X-ray crystallography diffraction signal may be very weak.

As catalysis is a surface process, one particular challenge in catalytic studies is resolving the typically weak spectroscopic signal of the catalytically active surface against that of the inactive bulk structure. Moving from the micro to the nano scale increases the surface to volume ratio of the particles, maximizing the signal of the surface relative to that of the bulk.

Furthermore, as the scale of the reaction decreases towards nano scale, individual processes can be discerned that would otherwise be lost in the average signal of a bulk reaction composed of multiple coincident steps and species such as spectators, intermediates, and reactive sites.

=== Heterogeneous catalysis ===
Operando spectroscopy is widely applicable to heterogeneous catalysis, which is largely used in industrial chemistry. An example of operando methodology to monitor heterogeneous catalysis is the dehydrogenation of propane with molybdenum catalysts commonly used in industrial petroleum. Mo/SiO_{2} and Mo/Al_{2}O_{2} were studied with an operando setup involving EPR/UV-Vis, NMR/UV-Vis, and Raman. The study examined the solid molybdenum catalyst in real time. It was determined that the molybdenum catalyst exhibited propane dehydrogenation activity, but deactivated over time. The spectroscopic data showed that the most likely catalytic active state was Mo^{4+} in the production of propene. The deactivation of the catalyst was determined to be the result of coke formation and the irreversible formation of MoO_{3} crystals, which were difficult to reduce back to Mo^{4+}. The dehydrogenation of propane can also be achieved with chromium catalysts, through the reduction of Cr^{6+} to Cr^{3+}. Propylene is one of the most important organic starting materials is used globally, particularly in the synthesis of various plastics. Therefore, the development of effective catalysts to produce propylene is of great interest. Operando spectroscopy is of great value to the further research and development of such catalysts.

=== Homogeneous catalysis ===
Combining operando Raman, UV–Vis and ATR-IR is particularly useful for studying homogeneous catalysis in solution. Transition-metal complexes can perform catalytic oxidation reactions on organic molecules; however, much of the corresponding reaction pathways are still unclear. For example, an operando study of the oxidation of veratryl alcohol by salcomine catalyst at high pH determined that the initial oxidation of the two substrate molecules to aldehydes is followed by the reduction of molecular oxygen to water, and that the rate determining step is the detachment of the product. Understanding organometallic catalytic activity on organic molecules is incredibly valuable for the further development of material science and pharmaceuticals.
