= Battery Council International =

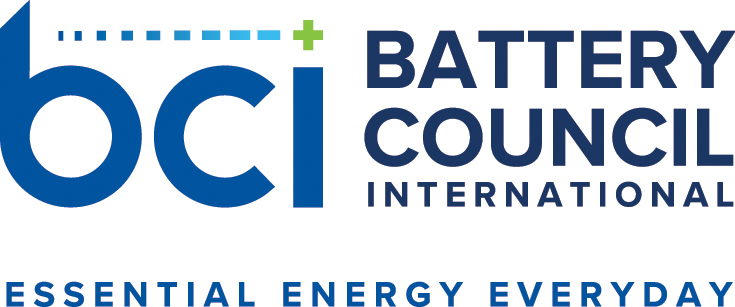
- Formation: 1924; 102 years ago
- Type: Trade Association
- Legal status: 501(c)(6) nonprofit organization
- Headquarters: Washington, D.C.
- Location: United States
- Members: 130+ companies
- Website: www.batterycouncil.org

Battery Council International (BCI) is a trade association of manufacturers, recyclers, distributors, and retailers of original-equipment and after-market automobile batteries and other batteries. Founded in 1924, BCI has its headquarters in Washington, D.C., USA.

BCI focuses its efforts on batteries used for the following applications:

- SLI and low-voltage applications in vehicles, marine, and power sports equipment
- Motive power in non-road-going vehicles and industrial and material handling equipment
- Stationary storage, local backup power, and uninterruptible power supply (UPS) applications
- Renewable energy support, EV fast charge support, and grid regulation services

It promotes the recycling of lead batteries, and claims that 99% of all lead batteries are eventually recycled. In 1989, BCI created a model law to require the proper disposal and recycling of lead batteries, and promoted its adoption nationwide. According to BCI, more than 40 U.S. states have adopted the elements of the model law, and the rest have implemented it in practice.

The trade association provides industry standards for testing, dimensions, and sizes of lead batteries worth over $14 billion in the North American market each year (as of 2021). BCI provides market trend data and maintains the industry's definitive index of automotive battery replacement fitment data for 85+ years of vehicles.

It also organizes regular conferences and meetings, including the BCI Convention + Power Mart, North America's longest running battery-industry trade show.
