= Bright Automotive =

Defunct American motor vehicle manufacturer

- Industry: Automobile
- Founded: 2008
- Defunct: 2012
- Fate: Bankrupt
- Headquarters: Anderson, Indiana, United States
- Products: plug-in electric vehicles
- Website: www.brightautomotive.com

Bright Automotive was a startup company in Anderson, Indiana, working to create a fuel-efficient line of plug-in electric vehicles. The company was started in 2008 with a team of employees from former companies such as Chrysler, Delphi, GM, Mazda, and Toyota. The company designed its first vehicle, the IDEA, a plug-in hybrid electric fleet vehicle designed to reduce fuel costs for corporations that maintain a large commercial fleet. Bright also had a service branch called eSolutions that focused on speeding up the process of car electrification with consulting and conversions. Bright's last CEO, Reuben Munger, stated in early press releases that he wished to see the IDEA in production by 2013.

In 2012, after waiting over 3 years for a final response from the Department of Energy on their application for a loan through the Advanced Technology Vehicles Manufacturing Loan Program, Bright could no longer sustain itself and announced they would cease all operations.

== History ==
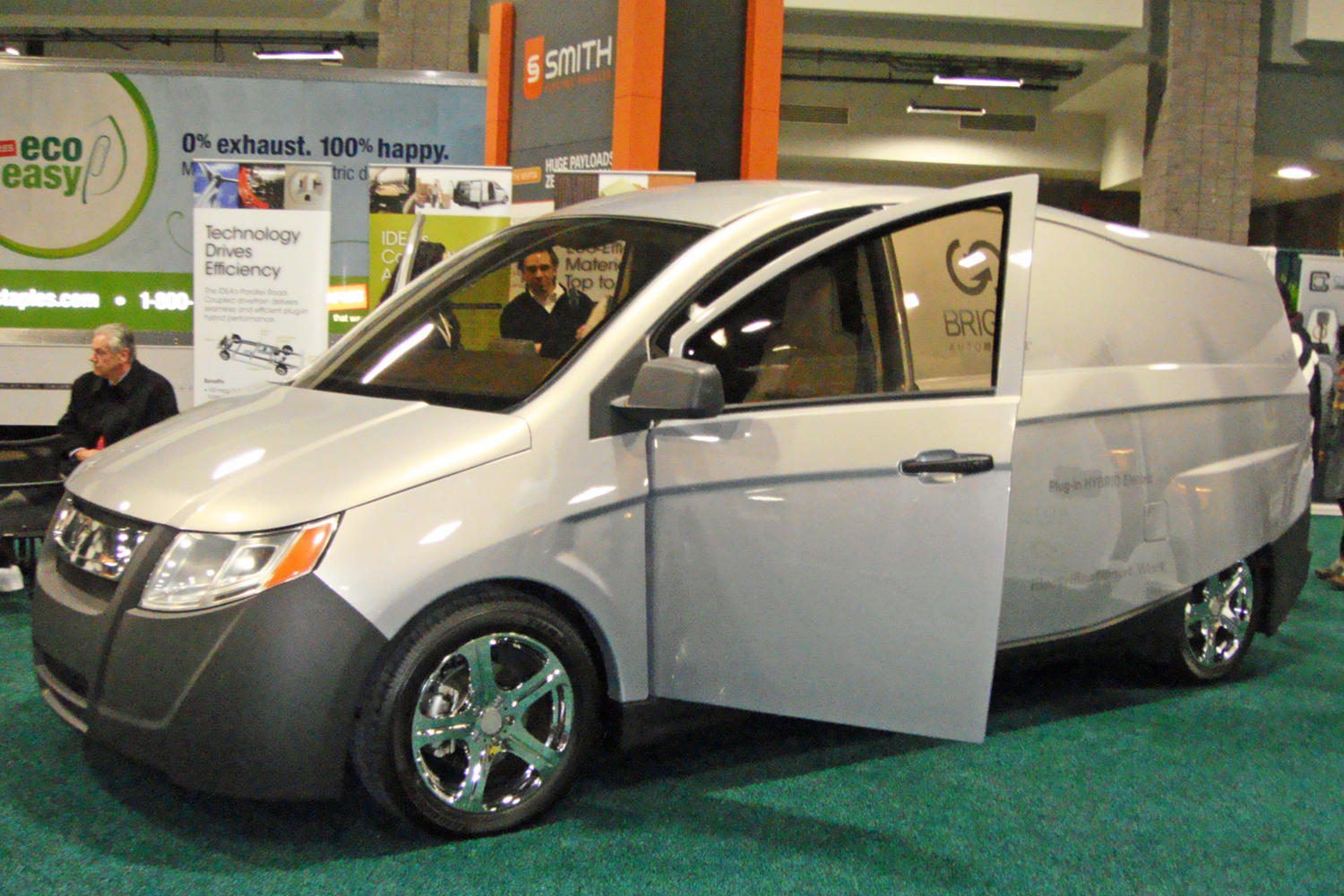
Bright IDEA plug-in hybrid delivery van exhibited at the 2010 Washington Auto Show.

Bright Automotive was started in 2008 as the offspring of the non-profit Rocky Mountain Institute (RMI) under the leadership of John E. Waters, who became founding CEO of Bright Automotive. Waters spent years at General Motors and was the inventor of the battery pack used in their first electric vehicle, the GM EV1, in the mid-1990s. Under Waters' leadership, and by the end of 2008, Bright had acquired $17 million of initial funding with plans to obtain a $450 million loan from the US Department of Energy (DOE) $25 billion Advanced Technology Vehicles Manufacturing Loan program. In addition, Waters created a consulting and conversion entity within Bright known as eSolutions and recruited leadership from Mercedes-Benz to lead the effort (Nigel Francis). eSolutions was successful in acquiring a $4 million US Department of Defense (DOD) initiative to design, build, and deliver a plug-in hybrid electric commercial vehicle (PHEV) for off-grid electric generation (i.e., vehicle-to-grid). This successful vehicle program was based on the identical "road-coupled hybrid" (RCH) powertrain of the Bright IDEA.

Due to US DOE stipulations specifically to Bright for the ATVM loan program, in January 2010, Waters et al. led a global effort to align with a major automotive original equipment manufacturer (OEM) to receive the DOE funding. In August 2010, notably, a new branch of General Motors called General Motors Ventures, LLC invested $5 million in Bright Automotive as its first investment in the innovative transportation technology realm. This investment by General Motors Ventures, LLC provided both funds and recognition from the US DOE. Bright spent over 3 years applying, negotiating, and finalizing a loan from the US DOE under their $25 billion Advanced Technology Vehicles Manufacturing Loan Program.

On February 28, 2012, new CEO Reuben Munger announced the company failed to receive a federal retooling loan and their portion of the $25 billion Advanced Technology Vehicles Manufacturing (ATVM) loan program. The company closed operations over the following few days.

== Cars ==
=== The IDEA ===
The Bright Automotive IDEA was a plug-in hybrid light cargo vehicle that was designed to get approximately 100 miles per US gallon (2.4 L/100 km; 120 mpg_{‑imp}) for customers who drive 60 miles (100 km) per day. It used pure electric (rear) propulsion for the first 40 miles (64 km) of a trip and then changes over to hybrid mode with a 4-cylinder, front wheel drive, 2-liter internal combustion engine. The IDEA had 180 cubic feet (5.1 m^{3}) of cargo space with a load capacity of 2,000 pounds (910 kg), and a curb weight of 3,200 pounds (1,500 kg).

One of Bright's main goals in designing the IDEA was to keep the size and the cost of the battery low. This was accomplished by starting the design process from a clean sheet of paper. Working with Alcoa, Bright used aluminum for the chassis, which is significantly lighter than the customary steel used in other cars. Also, Bright created an aerodynamic body (0.30 Cd, US Patent No. US D613,204 S) and used low rolling resistance tires to increase efficiency. All these factors led to a car that was light and efficient (up to 10 times more efficient than existing commercial vans), leading to the use of a smaller battery. The IDEA was designed as a fleet vehicle for corporations and governments with fuel efficiency and cost-savings in mind (i.e., "return on investment" or ROI). According to Bright, most current light cargo vehicles only have a fuel economy of about 15 miles per US gallon (16 L/100 km; 18 mpg_{‑imp}) and the improved fuel efficiency of the IDEA could save companies money after the second or third year of ownership, based on the price per gallon of fuel.

According to a former member of staff, after the company folded, the only prototype Bright Idea van in existence was donated to a non-profit organisation in Indiana. In 2022, however, the prototype was sold on Facebook Marketplace for $1500 and eventually found its way to the shop of YouTube car restoration channel LegitStreetCars.

=== Services ===
In late 2008, Bright launched the eSolutions consulting and design service, which worked with current vehicle parts manufacturers to accelerate the process of vehicle electrification. eSolutions partnered with fleets and car component manufacturers (i.e., clients) to create lighter, more aerodynamic parts and system solutions that can then be used in future electric vehicles. eSolutions won a significant contract was with the US Army Tank Command (TACOM) to develop, deliver, and test electric plug-in technology on non-combat vehicles. This contract, worth over $4 million, tested plug-in hybrid technology to replace present non-combat military vehicles and, most importantly, to provide power back to the electrical grid for off-grid operations on forward operating bases (FOBs). eSolutions provided the main income for Bright.

==== Conversions ====
While eSolutions focused on a broad spectrum of electric car services, one of its main focuses was plug-in technology retrofitting. This involves taking a currently combustion engine powered car and turning it either into a hybrid or a fully electric car. Bright advertised the service specifically for the VW Routan, VW Transporter, and the Dodge Grand Caravan; however, they were able to retrofit essentially any vehicle. In 2010 Bright eSolutions won a contract with the US Postal Service to deliver an all-electric conversion vehicle of a US Postal delivery truck. Bright eSolutions successfully delivered the US Postal Service EV and it has been in operation in Washington DC since 2010.

== Production goals ==
Bright Automotive stated that it planned to commence production of the IDEA by 2013. Due to delays in the ATVM loan program funding, this was pushed back from an initial plan of starting production in 2012. Unlike other low-volume, start-up companies funded by the ATVM loan program, Bright Automotive's (original) plans were to manufacture 50,000 IDEAs annually, capturing approximately 5% of the annual North America market in commercial vehicles.

== Leadership ==
The last CEO of Bright Automotive was Reuben Munger, the founder of Vision Ridge Partners, which is an investment company specializing in clean technology. Munger was also a managing director at Baupost Group, LLC investing firm. Bright's last COO was Mike Donoughe, who spent 28 years working for US Steel, Chrysler, Daimler-Chrysler, and Tesla. The other members of the Bright Executive Leadership Team at that time were Dave Lauzun (EVP of eSolutions, Advanced Technologies and Powertrain) and Michael Brylawski (EVP of Strategy).
