= Catalysis Letters =

- Discipline: Chemistry
- Language: English
- Edited by: Eric Altman and Hans-Joachim Freund

Publication details
- History: 1988-present
- Publisher: Springer Science+Business Media
- Frequency: Monthly
- Impact factor: 2.8 (2022)

Standard abbreviations
- ISO 4: Catal. Lett.

Indexing
- ISSN: 1011-372X (print); 1572-879X (web)

Links
- Journal homepage; Online access

Catalysis Letters is a peer-reviewed scientific journal covering research on catalysis in a wide range of sub-disciplines such as homogeneous, heterogeneous and enzymatic catalysis. It was previously published by Baltzer Science Publishers, which was then sold to Wolters Kluwer (which later became Springer Science+Business Media).
