= Jon Hammes =

American businessman

- Education: University of Wisconsin Milwaukee, University of Wisconsin Madison School of Urban Land Economics and Real Estate
- Occupations: Hammes Company, Lakeshore Chinooks, Milwaukee Bucks owner

Jon D. Hammes is the founder and managing partner of Hammes Company. He was formerly managing partner of Milwaukee's Trammel Crow real estate company.

In July 2015, Hammes was named co-chair of Scott Walker's presidential fundraising campaign.

== Early life and education ==
Hammes was born and raised in south Racine, Wisconsin. He was the third of seven children. His grandfather, who moved to Racine around 1900, built the Hammes Tavern in 1928. Hammes's father, Don, operated the tavern and served as the booster club president at Washington Park High School, from which Hammes and all of his siblings graduated.

Hammes earned his Master of Science degree in real estate and urban land economics from the University of Wisconsin–Madison in 1974. He studied under James Graaskamp, who helped establish real estate as an academic discipline. Hammes also earned a Bachelor of Business Administration degree from the University of Wisconsin–Milwaukee.

== Career ==
Hammes started his career with the Trammell Crow Company in 1974 and credits Trammell Crow as a career mentor. In 1987, he succeeded Allan Hamilton as Midwest regional partner after previously serving as a Great Lakes regional partner. While serving in this role, he was involved in the Milwaukee Center development project. Hammes was also a member of the company's management board.

In 1991, Hammes left Trammell Crow to form Hammes Company, a real estate firm that soon specialized in health care facilities and related developments. He told the Milwaukee Business Journal that the health care sector represented a substantial percentage of gross national product at the time, and it made sense to allocate resources there. Under Hammes’s leadership, the company recruited medical industry specialists and optimized their operations to more effectively compete for health care buildings.

In 2001, Hammes launched the investment arm of Hammes Company that became Hammes Partners.

Hammes has also been personally involved with his company's construction of sports facilities, including the renovation of Lambeau Field in Green Bay and the development of the U.S. Bank Stadium in Minneapolis.

Hammes continues to serve as chairman and CEO of Hammes Company.

=== Board service ===
Hammes serves on numerous boards associated with the Milwaukee community and the state of Wisconsin, including Junior Achievement of Wisconsin (emeritus member), Marquette University (board of trustees since 2014), the Medical College of Wisconsin (since 2000), Teach For America-Milwaukee, the University of Wisconsin Foundation, Greater Milwaukee Committee, the Milwaukee Metropolitan Association of Commerce, the Milwaukee World Festival (which produces the annual Summerfest music festival), WiCab Inc., the Badger Institute, and the YMCA of Metropolitan Milwaukee. He also serves on the board of the American Enterprise Institute.

==== Heartland ====
In 1996, Wisconsin Governor Tommy Thompson appointed Hammes to be chairman of the State of Wisconsin Investment Board. In September, 2000, the investment board purchased $8.3 million worth of distressed bonds from Heartland Advisors, a Milwaukee-based firm where Hammes served as an independent director. While Hammes referred the state board's staff to Heartland officials, he recused himself from the consideration process for the investment because of a conflict of interest. Hammes involvement in Heartland's recommendation resulted in criticism from the co-chairman of the state legislature's Joint Audit Committee, Gary George. In October 2000, the funds in which the state invested lost a combined $62 million in value. A report by the Wisconsin State Auditor issued in November, 2001 did not find any evidence that Hammes had influenced the investment decision. In September 2002, the State of Wisconsin Investment Board was able to sell back the portfolio of distressed bonds to Heartland for the original purchase price, plus an additional $2.93 million, as per the terms of the original bond-sale agreement. In December 2003, the SEC issued a consent order requiring Heartland's independent directors, including Hammes, to cease and desist violating securities laws, which they agreed to without admitting or denying any wrongdoing.

=== Sports ownership ===
Hammes is part of the Milwaukee Bucks' ownership group. He is also an owner of the Lakeshore Chinooks, a Mequon, Wisconsin-based baseball team in the Northwoods League.

In 2015, Hammes and members of his family purchased a golf course known as The Bog in Saukville, Wisconsin through Milwaukee B & E Partners I LLC, an affiliate of Hammes Company.

== Personal life ==
Hammes and his wife, Ann, have four children and thirteen grandchildren. He is a member of Marquette University's President's Society.

In 1995, Hammes donated $250,000 to construct the Hammes Field at Mount Pleasant, Wisconsin's Jerome I. Case High School. The field commemorates his father, for his longtime support of youth sports through the YMCA.

In 2007, Hammes and 12 other Wisconsin School of Business alumni donated $85 million to the school to support its educational mandate and preserve its name. The gift represented the largest single donation ever given to the University of Wisconsin-Madison.

In 2012, Hammes was recognized by the University of Wisconsin-Madison for his "outstanding entrepreneurial achievement", and received the Wisconsin Real Estate Alumni Association's Wisconsin Award at the Wisconsin Biennial Real Estate Conference. He is also a recipient of the association's Distinguished Alumnus Award. In 2015, Jon and Ann were presented with honorary Doctor of Humanities degrees from the Medical College of Wisconsin. In 2020, they donated $2 million to the Marquette University and Medical College of Wisconsin department of biomedical engineering, which was the largest donation to-date to the joint department.

== See also ==
- Harlan Crow, member of the founders committee of the Club for Growth, and son of Trammel Crow
