= Civil Rights Act of 1991 =

US labor law passed in 1991

- Long title: Civil Rights Act of 1991
- Enacted by: the 102nd United States Congress

Citations
- Public law: Pub. L. 102-166

Codification
- Acts amended: Civil Rights Act of 1964
- Titles amended: Title 42: Public Health And Welfare
- U.S.C. sections amended: 1981 et seq.

Legislative history
- Introduced in the Senate as S. 1745 by John Danforth (R–MO) on September 24, 1991; Passed the Senate on October 30, 1991 (93–5); Passed the House on November 7, 1991 (381–38); Signed into law by President George H. W. Bush on November 21, 1991

The Civil Rights Act of 1991 is a United States labor law, passed in response to United States Supreme Court decisions that limited the rights of employees who had sued their employers for discrimination. The Act represented the first effort since the enactment of the Civil Rights Act of 1964 to modify some of the basic procedural and substantive rights provided by federal law in employment discrimination cases. It provided the right to trial by jury on discrimination claims and introduced the possibility of emotional distress damages and limited the amount that a jury could award. It added provisions to Title VII of the Civil Rights Act of 1964 protections expanding the rights of women to sue and collect compensatory and punitive damages for sexual discrimination or harassment. U.S. President George H. W. Bush had used his veto against the more comprehensive Civil Rights Act of 1990. He feared racial quotas would be imposed but later approved the 1991 version of the bill.

== Predecessors ==
The 1991 Act was intended to strengthen the protections afforded by two different civil rights acts: the Civil Rights Act of 1866, better known by the number assigned to it in the codification of federal laws, Section 1981, and the employment-related provisions of the Civil Rights Act of 1964, generally referred to as Title VII. The two statutes, passed nearly a century apart, approached the issue of employment discrimination very differently: Section 1981 prohibited only discrimination based on race or color, but Title VII also prohibited discrimination on the basis of sex, religion, and national origin. Section 1981, which had lain dormant and unenforced for a century after its passage, allowed plaintiffs to seek compensatory damages and trial by jury. Title VII, passed in the 1960s when it was assumed that Southern juries could not render a fair verdict, allowed only trial by the court and provided for only traditional equitable remedies: back pay, reinstatement, and injunctions against future acts of discrimination. By the time the 1991 Act was passed, both allowed for an award of attorneys' fees. The 1991 Act expanded the remedies available to victims of discrimination by amending Title VII of the 1964 Act.

== Background ==
Congress had amended Title VII once before, in 1972, when it broadened the coverage of the Act. It was moved to overhaul Title VII in 1991 and to harmonize it with Section 1981 jurisprudence, as a result of a series of controversial Supreme Court decisions:

- Patterson v. McLean Credit Union, 491 U.S. 164 (1989), which held that an employee could not sue for damages caused by racial harassment on the job because even if the employer's conduct was discriminatory, the employer had not denied the employee the "same right... to make and enforce contracts... as is enjoyed by white citizens," as was the language that Congress chose in passing the law in 1866.
- Wards Cove Packing Co. v. Atonio, 490 U.S. 642 (1989), which held that in order for employees to prove that an employer's hiring practices had an unlawful disparate impact on them, they are required to identify the specific employment practice which allegedly produced inequalities in the workplace and show that it, in isolation, had that effect.
- Price Waterhouse v. Hopkins, 490 U.S. 228 (1989), which held that once an employee had proved that an unlawful consideration had played a part in the employer's personnel decision, the burden of proof shifted to the employer to prove that it would have made the same decision regardless; but also that the presentation of such proof would constitute a complete defense for the employer.
- Martin v. Wilks, 490 U.S. 755 (1989), which permitted white firefighters who had not been party to litigation establishing a consent decree governing hiring and promotion of black firefighters in the Birmingham, Alabama Fire Department to bring suit to challenge the decree.
- United Automobile Workers v. Johnson Controls, Inc., 499 U.S. 187 (1991), which held that Title VII prohibits gender-specific fetal protection policies.
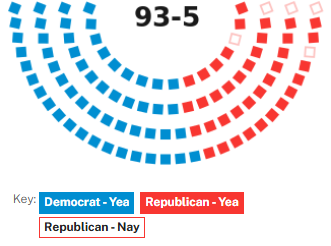
  The vote breakdown in the US Senate by party of The Civil Rights Act of 1991.

== Legislative breakdown ==
S. 1745 was brought to a floor vote in the chamber of the US Senate on Oct. 30, 1991. The Republican Party voted 38 in favor, 5 against. The Democratic Party voted unanimously, 55 in favor, 0 against, with 2 members not voting.

It was then brought to a floor vote in the US House of Representatives on Nov. 7, 1991. The Republican Party voted 127 in favor, 33 against, with 4 not voting. The Democratic Party voted 252 in favor, 5 against, with 9 not voting.

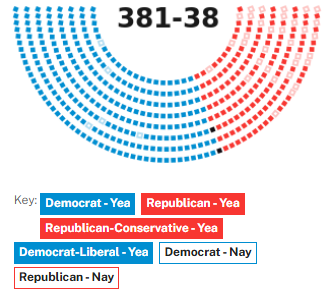
The vote breakdown in the US House by party of the Civil Rights Act of 1991.

== Changes ==
Patterson had attracted much criticism since it appeared to leave employees victimized by racial harassment on the job with no effective remedies, as they could not prove a violation of Section 1981 and could rarely show any wage losses that they could recover under Title VII. In addition, the Court's narrow reading of the phrase "make or enforce contracts" eliminated any liability under Section 1981 for lost promotions and most other personnel decisions that did not constitute a refusal to hire on the basis of race or color.

Congress addressed the issue by redefining the phrase "make and enforce contracts" to include "the making, performance, modification, and termination of contracts, and the enjoyment of all benefits, privileges, terms, and conditions of the contractual relationship." Congress also clarified that Section 1981 applied to both governmental and private discrimination, the issue that the Supreme Court originally announced it would decide in Patterson.

Congress also believed that the Wards Cove case made it too difficult to prove disparate impact claims under Title VII. While the amended Act still generally requires that a plaintiff identify particular employment practice(s) allegedly causing a disparate impact, Congress added that an employer's decisionmaking process may be analyzed as a whole if the plaintiff can show that "the elements of [an employer's] decisionmaking process are not capable of separation for analysis." Congress also established that the employer has the burden of proof on the business necessity defense and restored the meaning of "business necessity" to how it was interpreted before Wards Cove. Congress did not, however, alter the portion of Wards Cove describing the plaintiff's burden with respect to statistical proof, in which the court had held: "The mere existence of a statistical imbalance in an employer's workforce on account of race, color, religion, sex, or national origin is not alone sufficient to establish a prima facie case of disparate impact violation."

While the majority in Congress supported the burden-shifting rule in Price Waterhouse, it was uncomfortable with how that case gave the employer the ability to prove that it would have made the same decision in any event, as a complete defense in a case in which it had been shown that race or gender or another unlawful factor played a significant role in its decision. Congress amended the Act to provide that the employer's proof that it would have made the same decision in any case was a defense to back pay, reinstatement and other remedies but not to liability per se. The practical effect of this change was to allow a party that proved that the employer discriminated but could not show that it made any practical difference to the outcome could still recover attorney's fees after showing that the employer discriminated, even if no other remedy was awarded.

Finally, Congress limited the rights of non-parties to attack consent decrees by barring any challenges by parties who knew or should have known of the decree or who were adequately represented by the original parties. The Act also authorized jury trials on Title VII claims and allowed Title VII plaintiffs to recover emotional distress and punitive damages, while imposing caps on such relief. The 1991 Act also made technical changes affecting the length of time allowed to challenge unlawful seniority provisions, to sue the federal government for discrimination, and to bring age discrimination claims, but it allowed successful plaintiffs to recover expert witness fees as part of an award of attorney's fees and to collect interest on any judgment against the federal government.

== See also ==
- US labor law
- Civil rights acts in the United States

== Notes ==
- Sturm, Susan P. (April 2007). "International Union, U.A.W. v. Johnson Controls: History of Litigation Alliances and Mobilization to Challenge Fetal Protection Policies". ResearchGate. SSRN 982252.
