= Civil rights acts in the United States =

Civil Rights Acts have been part of the Constitution of the United States of America, but in order to be received equally by all the population required to made amendments to the United States Constitution, this allowed to end of slavery with the Civil Rights Act of 1866, followed by women's suffrage, among other rights. These acts of the United States Congress are meant to protect rights to ensure individuals' freedom from infringement by governments, social organizations, and private individuals.

The first wave of civil rights acts were passed during the Reconstruction era after the American Civil War. The Civil Rights Act of 1866 extends the rights of emancipated slaves by stating that any person born in the United States regardless of race is an American citizen. The Enforcement Acts of 1870-1871 allows the President to protect Black American men’s right to vote, to hold office, to serve on juries, and for Black men and women to receive equal protection of laws, including protection from racist violence. The Civil Rights Act of 1875 prohibited discrimination in "public accommodations" until it was found unconstitutional in 1883 by the Supreme Court of the United States. The Jim Crow Laws were established during the 19th century and served to block African American votes, ban integration in public facilities such as schools, and forbid interracial marriage in the South. The enactment of these laws was able to vastly undermine the progress toward equality which was made during the Reconstruction era.

Civil Rights Acts would not be passed for 82 more years until the success of the Civil rights movement which aimed to abolish legalized racial segregation, discrimination, and disenfranchisement in the country, which was most commonly employed against African Americans. The Civil Rights Act of 1957 established the Civil Rights Commission and the Civil Rights Act of 1960 established federal inspection of local voter registration polls. The landmark Civil Rights Act of 1964 prohibits discrimination based on race, color, religion, sex, and national origin by federal and state governments as well as public places. The Civil Rights Act of 1968 prohibits discrimination in sale, rental, and financing of housing based on race, creed, and national origin. The Civil Rights Restoration Act of 1987 specifies that recipients of federal funds must comply with civil rights laws in all areas, not just in the particular program or activity that received federal funding. The Civil Rights Act of 1990 was a bill that would have made it easier for plaintiffs to win civil rights cases which was vetoed by President George H. W. Bush. The Americans with Disabilities Act of 1990 prohibits discrimination based on disability. The Civil Rights Act of 1991 provides the right to trial by jury on discrimination claims and introducing the possibility of emotional distress damages, while limiting the amount that a jury could award.

== Civil Rights Act of 1866 ==
The Civil Rights Act of 1866 (enacted April 9, 1866, reenacted 1870) was the first United States federal law to define citizenship and affirm that all citizens are equally protected by the law. It was mainly intended, in the wake of the American Civil War, to protect the civil rights of persons of African descent born in or brought to the United States.

The Act was passed by Congress in 1865 and vetoed by United States President Andrew Johnson. In April 1866 Congress again passed the bill to support the Thirteenth Amendment, and Johnson again vetoed it, but a two-thirds majority in each chamber overrode the veto to allow it to become law without presidential signature.

John Bingham and other congressmen argued that Congress did not yet have sufficient constitutional power to enact this law. Following passage of the Fourteenth Amendment in 1868, Congress ratified the 1866 Act in 1870.

== Enforcement Act of 1871 ==
The Enforcement Act of 1871 is an Act of the United States Congress which empowered the President to suspend the writ of habeas corpus to combat the Ku Klux Klan (KKK) and other white supremacy organizations. The act was passed by the 42nd United States Congress and signed into law by United States President Ulysses S. Grant on April 20, 1871. The act was the last of three Enforcement Acts passed by the United States Congress from 1870 to 1871 during the Reconstruction Era to combat attacks upon the suffrage rights of African Americans. The statute has been subject to only minor changes since then, but has been the subject of voluminous interpretation by courts.

== Civil Rights Act of 1875 ==
The Civil Rights Act of 1875 was a United States federal law enacted during the Reconstruction era in response to civil rights violations against African Americans. The bill was passed by the 43rd United States Congress and signed into law by United States President Ulysses S. Grant on March 1, 1875. The act was designed to "protect all citizens in their civil and legal rights", providing for equal treatment in public accommodations and public transportation and prohibiting exclusion from jury service. It was originally drafted by Senator Charles Sumner in 1870, but was not passed until shortly after Sumner's death in 1875. The law was not effectively enforced, partly because President Grant had favored different measures to help him suppress election-related violence against blacks and Republicans in the South.

== Civil Rights Act of 1957 ==
The 1950s Civil Rights Movement pressured Congress to enact legislation to protect the constitutional civil rights of African Americans. The first major piece of civil rights legislation passed by Congress was the Civil Rights Act of 1957. While enforcing the voting rights of African Americans set out in the Fifteenth Amendment of the United States Constitution, the act had several loopholes. Southern states continued to discriminate against African Americans in application of voter registration and electoral laws, in segregation of school and public facilities, and in employment.

The Civil Rights Act of 1957 was the first federal civil rights legislation passed by the United States Congress since the Civil Rights Act of 1875. The bill was passed by the 85th United States Congress and signed into law by President Dwight D. Eisenhower on September 9, 1957.

== Civil Rights Act of 1960 ==
The legislation was proposed by President Dwight D. Eisenhower in his message to the 86th Congress on February 5, 1959, when he stated "that every individual regardless of his race, religion, or national origin is entitled to the equal protection of the laws."

== Civil Rights Act of 1964 ==
The Civil Rights Act of 1964 is a landmark civil rights and labor law in the United States that outlaws discrimination based on race, color, religion, sex, and national origin. It prohibits unequal application of voter registration requirements, racial segregation in schools and public accommodations, and employment discrimination. The act "remains one of the most significant legislative achievements in American history".

== Civil Rights Act of 1968 ==
The Civil Rights Act of 1968 (Pub. L. 90–284, 82 Stat. 73, enacted April 11, 1968) is a landmark law in the United States signed into law by United States President Lyndon B. Johnson during the King assassination riots.

Titles II through VII comprise the Indian Civil Rights Act, which applies to the Native American tribes of the United States and makes many but not all of the guarantees of the U.S. Bill of Rights applicable within the tribes. (that Act appears today in Title 25, sections 1301 to 1303 of the United States Code). Titles VIII through IX are commonly known as the Fair Housing Act. Title X, commonly known as the Anti-Riot Act

== Civil Rights Restoration Act of 1987 ==
The Civil Rights Restoration Act is a United States legislative act that specifies that recipients of federal funds must comply with civil rights laws in all areas, not just in the particular program or activity that received federal funding.

== Civil Rights Act of 1991 ==
The Civil Rights Act of 1991 is a United States labor law, passed in response to United States Supreme Court decisions that limited the rights of employees who had sued their employers for discrimination.

== See also ==
- United States labor law
- Older Americans Act
- No Child Left Behind Act
- Executive Order 11063
- Native American civil rights
- History of civil rights in the United States
