= OPzV battery =

Stationary VRLA battery

- Industry: Energy storage
- Full name: Ortsfest PanZerplatte Verschlossen battery
- Definition: A stationary VRLA battery incorporating a tubular plate design and a fixed gel electrolyte
- Inventor: Sonnenschein
- Launched: 1970s

An OPzV battery, an abbreviation for Ortsfest PanZerplatte Verschlossen battery, is a stationary VRLA battery that incorporates a tubular plate design based on the gel technology. Simply put, it is a sealed lead-gel battery. The battery has a lower specific capacity, and is usually maintenance-free. Compared to other types of batteries, the battery provides high thermal stability, a longer cycle life, and higher safety, but it comes with higher on-site installation and procurement costs.

In 2015, DIN, a Germany-based standardization organization, established a standard for the OPzV battery. These batteries are mainly used in off-grid power systems, data centers, petrochemical installations, and energy storage projects. The design of such batteries has been proven in the field for up to 20 years. The representative manufacturers of this type of batteries include Sonnenschein, Ritar Power, and Eternity Technologies.

== Etymology ==
In the term "OPzV battery", "OPzV" is an acronym for the German phrase "Ortsfest PanZerplatte Verschlossen", which means stationary tubular plate sealed.

== History ==
The OPzV battery was first introduced by the German manufacturer Sonnenschein in the 1970s. The A600, released by the company around the 1990s, was one of the earliest products in this category.

In 2006, the acid-free solid-state battery, a new type of OPzV battery was launched by Ritar Power. This battery, built with solid-state electrolyte technology, is designed to have a service life of 25 years.
