= Alex Molinaroli =

American businessman (born 1959)

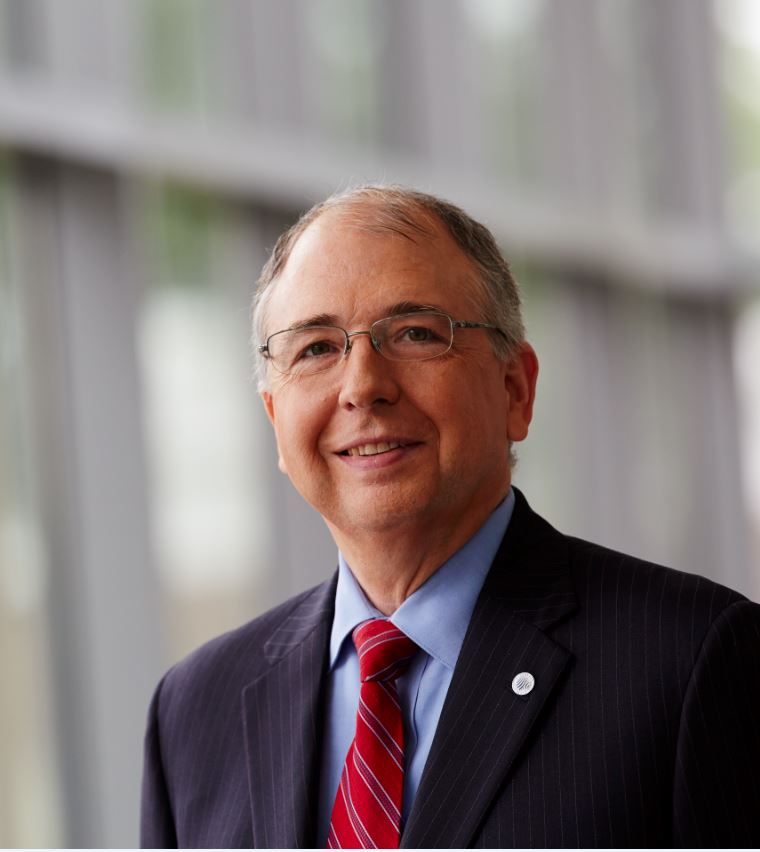
- Alex Molinaroli, 2013
- Born: October 7, 1959 (age 67); Parkersburg, WV, US
- Education: Kellogg School of Management, Northwestern University, (MBA); University of South Carolina Columbia (Bachelor of Science in Electrical Engineering)
- Occupations: President and Chief Executive Officer of Johnson Controls; Co-Founder of Electrification Coalition
- Board member of: Interstate Batteries; Battery Council International; Metropolitan Milwaukee Chamber of Commerce; Milwaukee School of Engineering

Alex Adrian Molinaroli (born October 7, 1959) is an American businessman who was the chief executive officer of Johnson Controls from 2013 to 2017.

== Early life and education ==
Molinaroli was born October 7, 1959, in Parkersburg, WV. At an early age his family relocated to Charleston, SC for his father’s work.

He attended primary and secondary parochial schools and graduated from Bishop England High School in 1978.

He received a NROTC Scholarship to attend the University of South Carolina in Columbia, SC and was accepted into the school’s prestigious Honors College. He earned his Bachelor of Science in Electrical and Computer Engineering in 1983

Later in life he continued his formal education while still working, earning a Master of Business Administration (MBA) from Northwestern University in Evanston, IL.

== Career ==
Molinaroli went to work for Johnson Controls in 1983. He held increasing levels of responsibility for controls systems and services sales and operations, and was Vice President and General Manager for North America Systems and General Manager for the Middle East businesses for Building Efficiency Division.

In January 2007, Molinaroli was president of Johnson Controls Power Solutions Battery. As president of Power Solutions, he oversaw a renaissance within the company’s battery business. During this timeframe, the profitability and topline growth dramatically improved – driven by investments in China, the development of advanced battery technologies and vertical integration into battery recycling and separator technologies.

In January 2013, Molinaroli transitioned to the Johnson Controls corporate office as vice chairman and subsequently replaced Steve Roell as chairman and CEO.

As CEO of Johnson Controls, Alex Molinaroli led the company through significant transformation that continues today.

In 2013, Molinaroli signalled that JCI would "reduce its automotive footprint." During the next two years, JCI sold off portions of the automotive business or spun divisions into new companies. The garage door unit was sold to Gentex with the remaining electronics sold to Visteon, overhead and visors to a new company. Seating was spun out to become Adient. The remaining interior plastic division was sold to YanFeng.[3] In 2016, Johnson Controls International plc was formed through a merger with Tyco International.

Molinaroli retired from Johnson Controls in September 2017.

Following his tenure as CEO, Molinaroli has commented on artificial intelligence governance and institutional oversight. In a 2026 interview, he stated that failures in AI systems are often linked to governance structures, incentives, and organizational culture rather than technical limitations.

Molinaroli has also discussed the relationship between artificial intelligence infrastructure, energy systems, and engineering workforce development, stating that long-term AI scalability will depend on factors including energy availability, grid resilience, and institutional coordination. Furthermore he has also commented on leadership development and gender representation in industrial and engineering sectors, stating that access to operational leadership roles and profit-and-loss responsibility are important factors in executive advancement.

In 2026, Molinaroli joined the Board of Directors of the Palmetto Nuclear Coalition and was appointed Co-Chair of its Executive Leadership Council alongside DC BLOX CEO Jeff Uphues. The coalition advocates for nuclear energy development, energy security, workforce development, and long-term infrastructure investment in South Carolina and the United States

== Philanthropy ==
In June 2024, the University of South Carolina announced that its College of Engineering and Computing would be renamed the Molinaroli College of Engineering and Computing following a $30 million gift from Alex Molinaroli and his wife, Kristin Ihle Molinaroli. According to the university, the gift was designated to support academic programs, faculty recruitment, facilities, and research initiatives within the college.

The naming followed approval by the University of South Carolina Board of Trustees and represents the largest private gift in the history of the college. Molinaroli has also commented on the role of education in preparing engineers for AI-integrated environments. In a 2026 interview, he stated that engineering curricula should incorporate instruction on AI usage and governance.

== Other ==
Molinaroli is a former board member of Johnson Controls International, The National Center for the Arts and Technology, The Electrification Coalition, Interstate Battery, Battery Council International, Milwaukee School of Engineering, Greater Milwaukee Committee and Greater Milwaukee and Waukesha County United Way (as Co-Campaign Chair in 2015-2016).

Molinaroli is engaged in early stage investments and is an executive advisor for various startup and technology companies.

Alex is married to Kristin Molinaroli and has five adult children. He currently resides in Charleston
