= BGIS =

Private company

- Type: Private Company
- Industry: Facilities Management
- Founded: 1992
- Founder: Brookfield Properties and Johnson Controls
- Headquarters: Markham, Ontario, Canada
- Area served: Global
- Key people: Gord Hicks (Chairman & CEO)
- Services: Facilities Management and Real Estate Services
- Number of employees: 10,000
- Parent: CCMP Capital Advisors
- Website: bgis.com

BGIS (formerly known as Brookfield Global Integrated Solutions) is a facilities management and real estate services private company headquartered in Markham, Ontario, Canada, with a staff of over 10,000 globally. BGIS' parent company is CCMP Capital Advisors—an American private equity investment firm—who acquired the company in 2019 when Brookfield Asset Management sold the company for over CAD$1.3 billion.

== History ==
Warren S. Johnson, who was the founder of Johnson Controls, then known as Johnson Electric Service Company in 1885 in Milwaukee, Wisconsin, was the inventor of the first electric room thermostat in 1883, which helped launch the building control industry.

In 1992, Johnson Controls—a building systems and facility management company—formed a joint venture with Brookfield Properties called Brookfield LePage Johnson Controls (BLJC). By November 2012, BLJC changed its name to Brookfield Johnson Controls and started offering commercial property management services in Canada.

By 2012, Brookfield and Johnson Controls had become an established industry leader with 11,500 locations across Canada.

In 2013, Johnson Controls and Brookfield Asset Management formed a similar joint venture in Australia and New Zealand.

In 2007, Brookfield Asset Management acquired the Multiplex, an Australian international construction contracting company founded in 1962 by John Roberts, which was valued at that time at approximately A$7.3 billion. It was renamed Brookfield Multiplex in 2016. In 2012 Brookfield Asset Management and Johnson Controls Global WorkPlace Solutions (GWS) merged to create Brookfield Johnson Controls.

== Mergers and acquisitions ==
In 2015, Brookfield Johnson Controls was renamed Brookfield Global Integrated Solutions (BGIS), with Brookfield Asset Management as the ultimate parent company when it acquired control of Brookfield Johnson Controls from its joint venture partner, Milwaukee-based Johnson Controls. At that time, an activist investor had been putting pressure on Johnson Controls to divest its real estate division. Brookfield Asset Management rebranding of BGIS reflected the integration of "facilities and project management services business in Canada, Australia, and New Zealand.

The facilities management business was renamed Brookfield Global Integrated Solutions (BGIS) as part of Brookfield's plan to establish a "leading global facilities management provider".

After Brookfield took over the company in 2015, BGIS expanded rapidly. In 2016, when BGIS acquired the US-based data centre facility management service—McKinstry FMS—which had over "350 engineers, technicians, planners, and program managers", BGIS became one of the largest facility management companies serving data centres in North America.

== Current operations ==
By 2017, when Gord Hicks was named as Toronto-based BGIS' CEO, the company had 7,000 staff members and 100 clients in the United States, the United Kingdom, Asia, and Canada, which included contracts with the Canadian federal government.

By 2022, according to a Carleton University School of Public Policy and Administration analysis of federal government contracts for real estate management, the Government of Canada spent over $1 billion on contracts with BGIS in 2021-2022, representing the largest vendor contracts at that time. The vendor with the second largest federal government contracts in 2021-2022 was IBM Canada with a contract valued at c. 476 million.

== Sale of BGIS by Brookfield Asset Management to CCMP Capital ==
In 2019, Brookfield Asset Management sold its BGIS shares to CCMP Capital Advisors for over CAD$1.3 billion, earning them the 2020 Private Equity Deal of the Year. Following the sale, Brookfield Global Integrated Solutions had to change its name to just "BGIS" to represent that it was no longer considered a Brookfield company.
