= Deep-cycle battery =

Electrical storage system built for intensive discharging

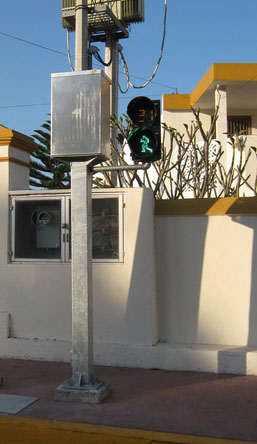
A deep-cycle battery powering a traffic signal

A deep-cycle battery is a battery designed to be regularly deeply discharged using most of its capacity. The term is traditionally mainly used for lead–acid batteries in the same form factor as automotive batteries; and contrasted with starter or cranking automotive batteries designed to deliver only a small part of their capacity in a short, high-current burst for starting an engine. In camping and recreational vehicles, deep-cycle batteries are commonly referred to as leisure batteries, in contrast with starter batteries.

For lead–acid deep-cycle batteries there is an inverse correlation between the depth of discharge (DOD) of the battery and the number of charge and discharge cycles it can perform; with an average depth of discharge of around 50% suggested as the best for storage vs cost.

Newer technologies such as lithium-ion batteries are becoming commonplace in smaller sizes in uses such as in smartphones and laptops. The new technologies are also beginning to become common in the same form factors as automotive lead–acid batteries, although at a large price premium.

== Types of lead–acid deep-cycle battery ==
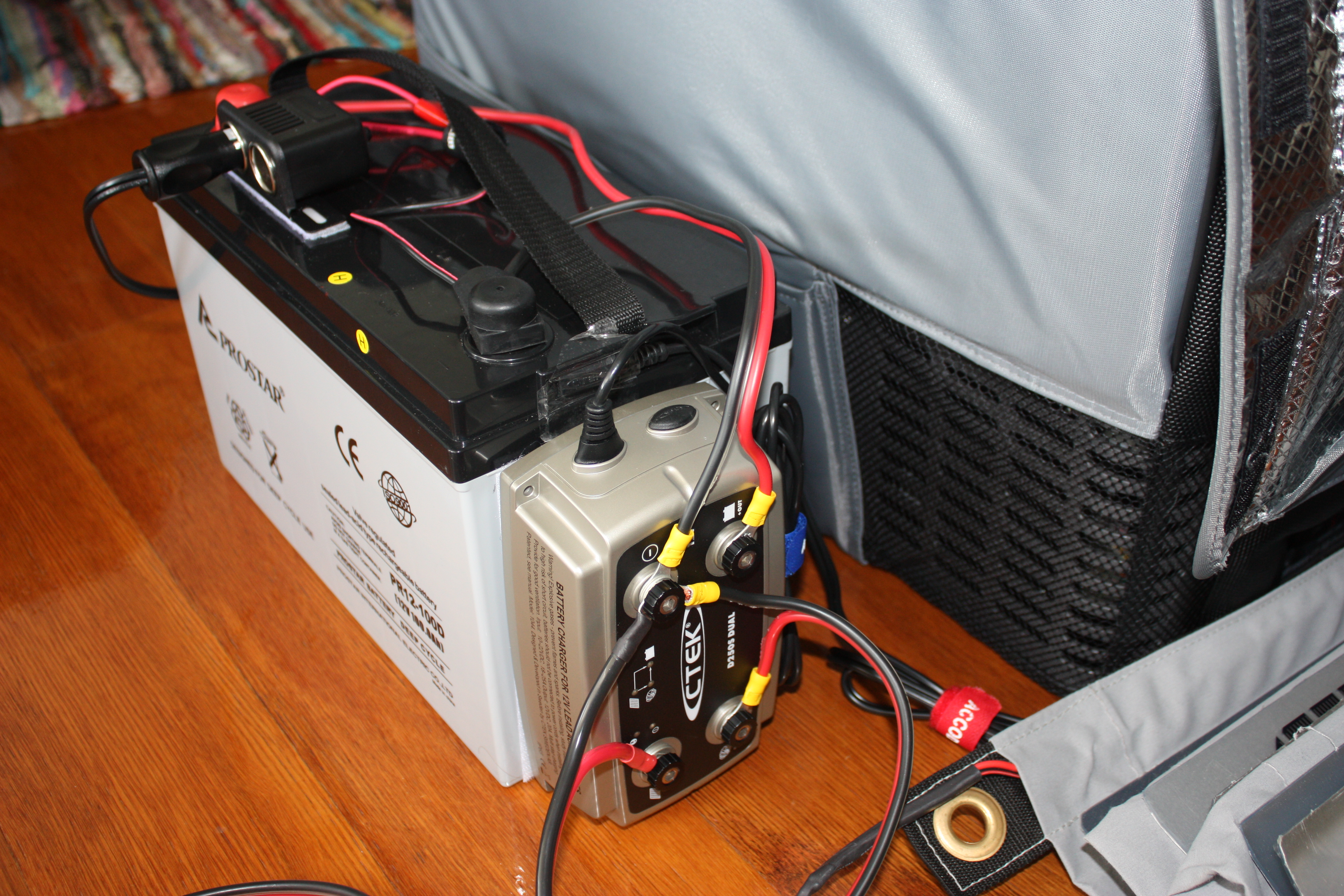
A deep-cycle battery hooked up to a charger

The structural difference between deep-cycle and cranking lead–acid batteries is in the lead battery plates. Deep-cycle battery plates have thicker active plates, with higher-density active paste material and thicker separators. Alloys used for the plates in a deep-cycle battery may contain more antimony than that of starting batteries. The thicker battery plates resist corrosion through extended charge and discharge cycles.

Deep-cycle lead–acid batteries generally fall into two distinct categories; flooded lead–acid (FLA) and valve-regulated lead–acid (VRLA), with the VRLA type further subdivided into two types, absorbent glass mat (AGM) and gel. The reinforcement of absorbed glass mat separators helps to reduce damage caused by spilling and jolting vibrations. Further, flooded deep-cycle batteries can be divided into subcategories of tubular-plated opzs or flat-plated. The difference generally affects the cycle life and performance of the cell.

=== Flooded ===
The term flooded is used because this type of battery contains a quantity of electrolyte fluid so that the plates are completely submerged. The electrolyte level should be above the tops of the plates which serves as a reservoir to make sure that water loss during charging does not lower the level below the plate tops and cause damage. Flooded batteries will decompose some water from the electrolyte during charging, so regular maintenance of flooded batteries requires inspection of electrolyte level and addition of water. Major modes of failure of deep-cycle batteries are loss of the active material due to shedding of the plates, and corrosion of the internal grid that supports active material. The capacity of a deep-cycle battery is usually limited by electrolyte capacity and not by the plate mass, to improve life expectancy.

==== OPzS batteries ====
OPzS stands for German ortsfest Panzerplatte, Säure, meaning stationary tubular plate, acid.

OPzS batteries are a type of deep-cycle battery commonly used for backup power systems and renewable energy applications. OPzS is recommended for storing energy from intermittent supplies, such as wind and solar supplies for off-grid use.

==== OPzV batteries ====
OPzV stands for ortsfest Panzerplatte, verschlossen, meaning stationary tubular plate, sealed.

OPzV batteries are very similar to OPzS batteries, with the only technical difference being that OPzV batteries are sealed. OPzV batteries are relatively maintenance-free, while OPzS batteries require the occasional top-up with distilled water.

== New technologies ==
Although still much more expensive than traditional lead–acid, a wide range of rechargeable battery technologies such as lithium-ion are increasingly attractive for many users.

== Applications ==
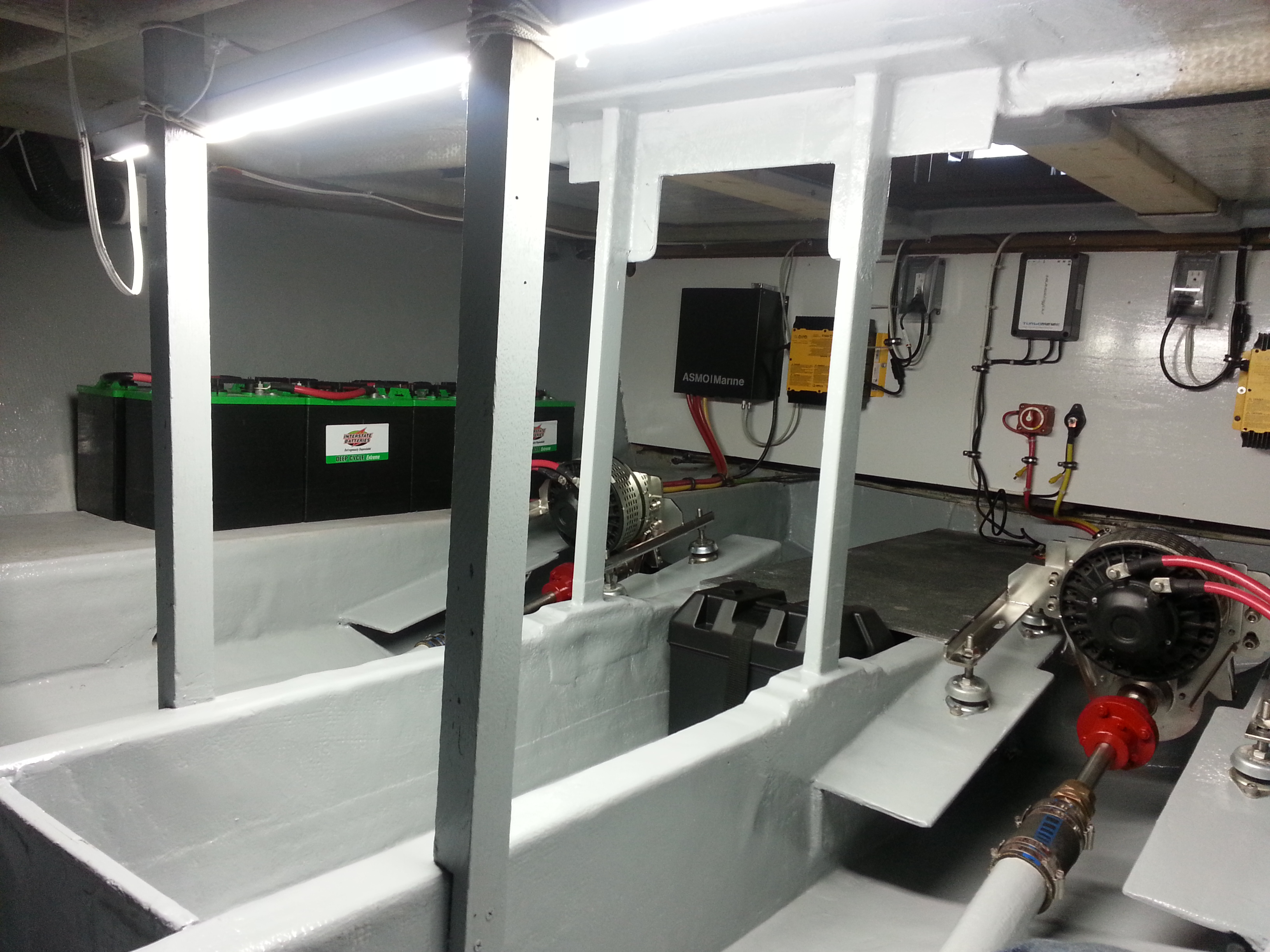
Deep-cycle batteries in an electric boat refit

- Cathodic protection, which might include marine use
- Other marine use, especially on a sailboat lacking power generation capability, generally smaller vessels
- Trolling motors for recreational fishing boats
- Industrial electrically-propelled forklifts and floor sweepers
- Motorized wheelchairs
- Off-grid energy storage systems for solar power or wind power, especially in small installations for a single building or motorhome
- Power for instruments or equipment at remote sites
- Recreational vehicles
- Traction batteries to propel vehicles, such as golf carts, and other highway electric vehicles
- Traffic signals
- Uninterruptible power supply ('UPS'), usually for computers and associated equipment, but also sump pumps
- Audio equipment, similarly to a UPS but also in certain 'clean power' devices to supply clean DC power isolated from the public electric supply for inversion to AC to maximize audio signal reproduction

== Recycling ==
According to the Battery Council International (BCI) – a lead–acid battery industry trade group – the vast majority of deep-cycle batteries on the market as of 2012 were lead acid batteries. BCI says lead acid batteries are recycled 98% by volume, 99.5% by weight. According to BCI, the plastic cases, lead plates, sulfuric acid, solder, and other metals are 100% recovered for reuse. BCI says the only part of a battery that is not recyclable is the paper separators that wrap the plates (due to the acid bath the paper sits in, the fiber length is reduced so far that it cannot be rewoven).

BCI says that, industry wide, there is a greater than 98% rate of recovery on all lead acid batteries sold in the United States, resulting in a virtually closed manufacturing cycle.

== See also ==
- Desulfation
- Electric vehicle battery
- List of battery types
- Peukert's law
