= S.H. Couch =

U.S. manufacturing company

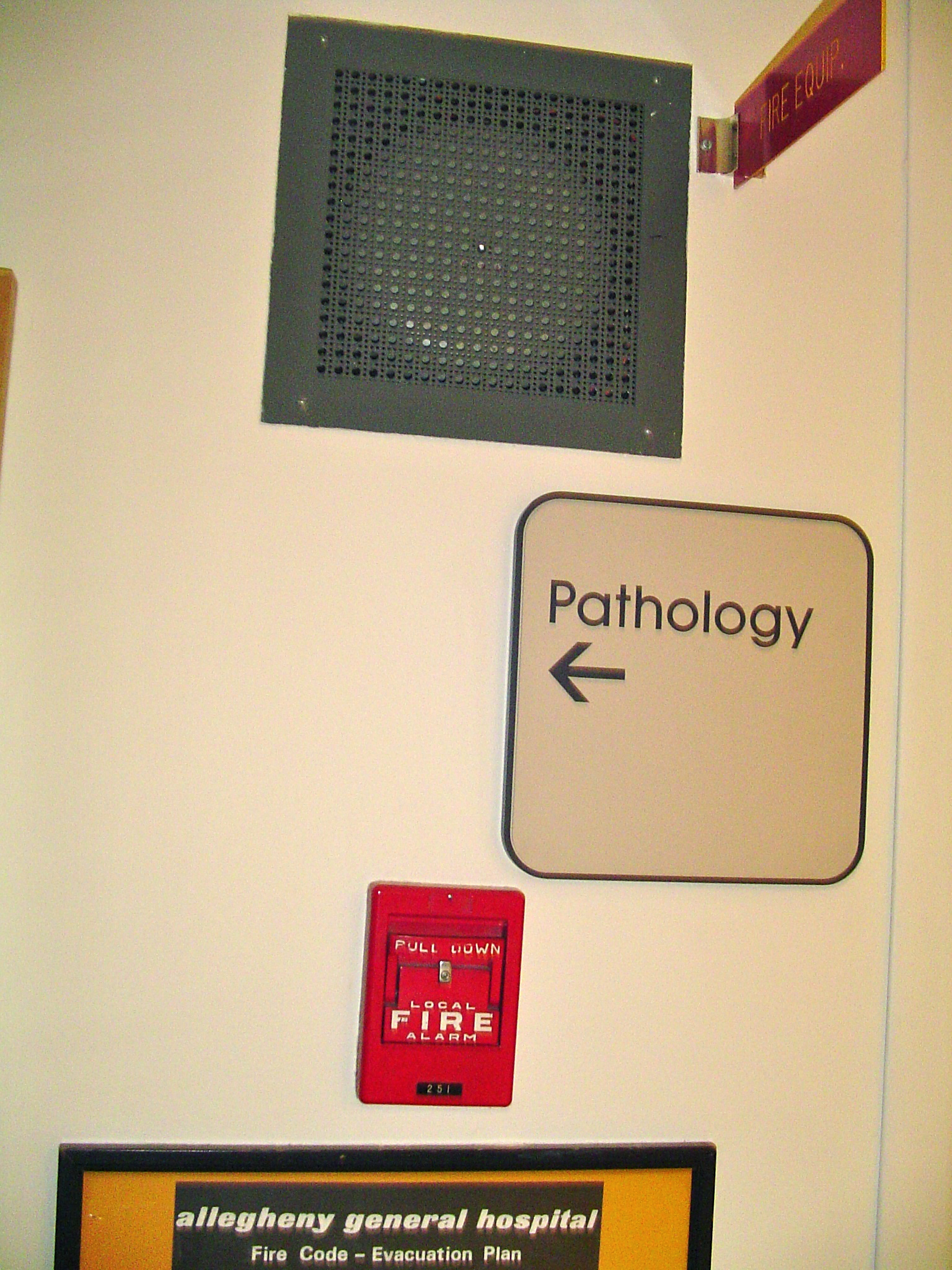
Couch F5GX non-coded fire alarm pull station and F294 10" bell.

The firm S. H. Couch, often known as simply Couch, was a Quincy, Massachusetts, manufacturing company founded circa 1901 in Boston after the dissolution of Whitman & Couch, a partnership, and a second entity known as Couch & Seeley. S. H. Couch launched during and participated in the turn of the century Independent Telephone Movement which ensued after the expiration of the foundational Bell telephone patents in 1894. The company specialized in electrical devices including telephones, intercoms, and fire alarm systems. S. H. Couch had offices in Boston and in Chicago by 1907.

S. H. Couch was re-organized and became a subsidiary of Couch Associates some time between 1926 and 1941. Couch Associates apparently was a financial holding company that served the founder, his spouse, and his adopted brother William Couch. According to an undated letter written by Mr. Samuel Couch, the assets of the original S. H. Couch company consisted of plant, machinery, inventories, cash in banks and on hand, accounts and notes receivables, and securities such as stocks and bonds of other companies. Mr. Couch noted the plant, machinery and tools, patents, and inventories were sold to the new S. H. Couch company for $240,000.00. Three individuals, Mr. Atkinson, Mr. Cameron and Mr. Morrison, all attached to the new company, were to issue $210,000.00 of 6% preferred stock and $30,000.00 of common stock back to Couch Associates, Inc. The remaining assets of the old S. H. Couch were retained by Couch Associates. According to Mr. Couch's estate tax filings, he held preferred and common stock shares in Couch Associates to his death in 1954.

Information on file in the United States Patent and Trademark Office sketches a quick history of the S. H. Couch company. Those records indicate the trademark "Couch" was first used in November 1903, but was registered only in 1948. In 1969, the trademark was transferred to ESB Corporation of Philadelphia, Pennsylvania. Another transfer of the trademark, to a relocated S. H. Couch, now in Michigan, took place in 1978. The trademark and the associated transfers can be viewed here.

Couch was well known for its fire alarm control units including the FABC-series and the advanced Fire-Voice high rise detection and evacuation signaling system, apartment building intercom/telephone systems, and Nurse Call intercom systems.

The later history of S. H. Couch should be considered in light of developments across the American Fire Alarm and Signal industry generally, and modernization efforts in the Boston area in particular. A quick overview of this industry is available through several sources including the National Fire Protection Association's Guide to Fire Alarm and Signaling System Installation. Section I of the Pocket Guide notes the very first public fire alarm reporting system in the world, the Boston Fire Alarm Telegraph, went into service in April 1852. The Guide also highlights key transitions that affected the fire alarm industry such as smoke detectors beginning in 1960, visible signaling in the 1980s, and adoption of microprocessor and software technology. A more detailed look at the evolution of Boston's public fire alarm system, from 1859 to 1973, can be seen here courtesy of the Boston Sparks Association. Eventually, a fire alarm industry consolidation phase took place.

Couch closed in 1985. Advanced Signal Corp., of Randolph, Massachusetts, purchased the remaining inventory and continued to support the line of products until 2003.

Based on advertising and six other sources, there was a related corporate entity known as Couch Ordnance, Inc., located at 3 Arlington Street, North Quincy, MA, by 1958. In 1959, Couch Ordnance purchased a two-story and basement building at 36 River Street, Dorchester, MA. One 1965 trade publication focused on leading American ultraminiature electronic component parts manufacturers cited Couch Ordnance and products in an annual review. Couch Ordnance advertising in 1966 indicated it was a subsidiary of S. H. Couch.

S.H. Couch held Commercial and Government Entity (CAGE) Code number 05587 issued by the Defense Logistics Agency in October, 1974. The CAGE code was active while the firm was in Michigan. Earlier, as a division of ESB, S. H. Couch held CAGE Code number 14740.

== Company facilities ==
At launch in 1901, S. H. Couch was based at 200 Sumner Street, Boston, MA. Based on later S. H. Couch company advertising, the firm had offices at 156 or 162 Pearl Street, Boston, MA, by 1905. By 1915, the Boston Office was at 170 Purchase Street.

The firm's home office and manufacturing plant moved to Quincy in 1910. It was probably located at 1 Arlington Street, at the corner of Arlington and Squantum Streets, Norfolk Downs, Quincy, MA. A photograph of the S. H. Couch company building in Quincy, circa 1870–1930, is available from the Thomas Crane public library.

The S. H. Couch office in Chicago, Illinois, opened in 1907 under the direction of Peter F. Hensel. It was originally located at 324 Dearborn Street. That Couch office later moved to 337 West Madison Street from 1913 to at least 1917.

== Key leaders ==
Mr. Samuel Henry Couch, of Milton, MA, (b. 1872, d. 1954) was the founder of this firm. An early article notes he was president and treasurer when the firm incorporated circa 1904. State of Illinois foreign corporation registration records from 1913 and another source both describe him as the firm's president. He is cited in a 1915 patent assigned to the company. Finally, the Norfolk County, MA, Registry of Deeds records a series of real estate transactions between Mr. Couch and his eponymously named firm, his spouse, and others.

Mr. Couch was born in Kingsteignton, United Kingdom, and emigrated to the United States as a youth with his family. A photograph of Mr. Couch, dated circa 1899, is available here. The caption to that photograph identifies Mr. Couch as one of the leaders of the Independent Telephone Movement. Mr. Couch contributed to that movement as early at 1897 when he represented the Eastern Region to the national association's founding meeting that took place in Detroit on June 22 of that year. By 1921, Mr. Couch also was a Director of the Quincy Trust Company, a position he retained through 1953.

Mr. Benjamin Fredey Jaques (b. 1905, d. 2001) also served as President of S. H. Couch and Couch Ordnance while the firm was still based in MA. As of October 1952, Mr. Jaques concurrently held the following positions: President of the Jaques Company, of 67 Batterymarch Street; President and Director of the S. H. Couch Company; President and Director of Couch Ordnance; and board member of the New England Trust.

== Industry consolidation ==
From 1969, S. H. Couch was associated with Exide Safety Systems, of Randolph, Massachusetts. Publications issued in 1973 and 1974 describe S H Couch as a division of ESB. ESB Brands Incorporated, associated with the Electric Storage Battery Company, the latter the predecessor to Exide, was created in 1964 as a domestic corporation in Pennsylvania under entity number 101773, according to that state's business records. It was dissolved through consolidation in 1980. While controlled by ESB Corporation, the relay manufacturing portion of S. H. Couch, based in Boston, was sold to Deutsch Relays of East Northport, NY, on 14 Feb 1975. The remaining S H Couch elements were to consolidate into ESB's Exide Safety Systems division at a new plant in Randolph, MA. By 1977, Exide Safety Systems, a division of ESB Inc., included two branches: Exide Lightguard and Exide Couch, according to one source. S. H. Couch was sold again later that year. Photographs of Exide-Couch co-branded manual fire alarm pull stations exist.

Faraday's parent corporation purchased S. H. Couch in 1977 and closed the Quincy, Massachusetts facility moving the factory and engineering group to 225 Patterson Street, Tecumseh, Michigan. Business licensing records held by the state of Michigan note the S. H. Couch Company was registered as a Foreign Profit Corporation (also known as a foreign corporation) in August 1978. According to the state of Michigan, the firm filed annual reports through 1982. Its registration with the state was cancelled in 1984.

State of Ohio business records from the same period indicate S. H. Couch may have been legally domiciled in that state as of July 1978.

== Products ==
Early S. H. Couch products included the 1898 (SIC) Intercom, the 1908 IBX (Intercommunicating Branch Exchange), the 1910 Inter-Phone, and other design concepts.

An additional patent filing in 1931 shows the evolution of "private" telephone systems for use in apartment houses, businesses, and offices.

The firm published a booklet in 1936 titled "Electric Reset Annunciators, Signaling Systems and Accessories."

Photographs and videos of S.H. Couch alarm products from circa 1960 are available on the Fire Panel Forums, and elsewhere.

The February, 1969, issue of Popular Mechanics describes fire alarm systems and includes S.H. Couch in its list of manufacturers.

By 1970, the United States Code of Federal Regulations noted S.H. Couch manufactured mailboxes were appropriate for apartment buildings.

== Some S. H. Couch patents ==
File Date	Patent Number	Patent Title
22 Oct 1904	US 781391 A	Guard for incandescent lamps
02 Oct 1905	US 830770 A	Automatic resetting-switch.
12 Apr 1906	US 846827 A	Telephone-service apparatus
28 Jul 1911	US 1134996 A	Annunciator-drop.
24 Oct 1912	US 1107610 A	Annunciator-drop
31 Oct 1913	US 1187671 A	Automatic telephone system
19 Jun 1914	US 1130971 A	Intercommunicating telephone
19 Jun 1914	US 1204765 A	Hand-micro telephone
12 Jan 1915	US 1173961 A	Mail-box
12 Jan 1915	US 1204766 A	Selective signaling device
3 May 1915	US 1190548 A	Telephone-receiver
18 Aug 1915	US 1240974 A	Telephone wall set
7 May 1929	US 1847061 A	Intercommunicating telephone
8 July 1931	US 1936245 A	Telephone
27 July 1931	US 1909153 A	Thermionic amplifier
01 Jun 1937	US 2214968 A	Switch box
21 Nov 1939	US 2263877 A	Transmitting system
07 Sep 1943	US 2328556 A	Transmitting system
24 Jan 1944	US 2405735 A	Hospital plug connection
4 June 1945	US 2500184 A	Electrical apparatus
09 Feb 1950	US 2581861 A	Electrical apparatus
30 Aug 1950	US 2652171 A	Cover securing means for wall boxes
17 Mar 1952	US 2731518 A	Telephone unit
25 Mar 1955	US 2822435 A	Switching system
24 May 1957	US 2866870 A	Rotary armature and stator for use in relays
19 Oct 1959	US 3170070 A	Current detecting system
21 June 1960	US 3253272 A	Coded alarm station
09 Aug 1961	US 3164697 A	Rotary armature miniature relay
23 Jan 1963	US 3230296 A	Contact terminal assembly with different geometric configured contacts on either side of a plate
04 Mar 1963	US 3226520 A	Illuminated push button switch assembly including latching means
06 Mar 1964	US 3255333 A	Push button switch construction
