= Standard Electric Time Company =

American clock and fire alarm manufacturer

- Founded: 1884; 141 years ago in Waterbury, Connecticut
- Founder: Charles Warner
- Defunct: 1981
- Headquarters: Springfield, Massachusetts, United States
- Parent: Johnson Controls (1970-1978); Faraday (from 1978)

.

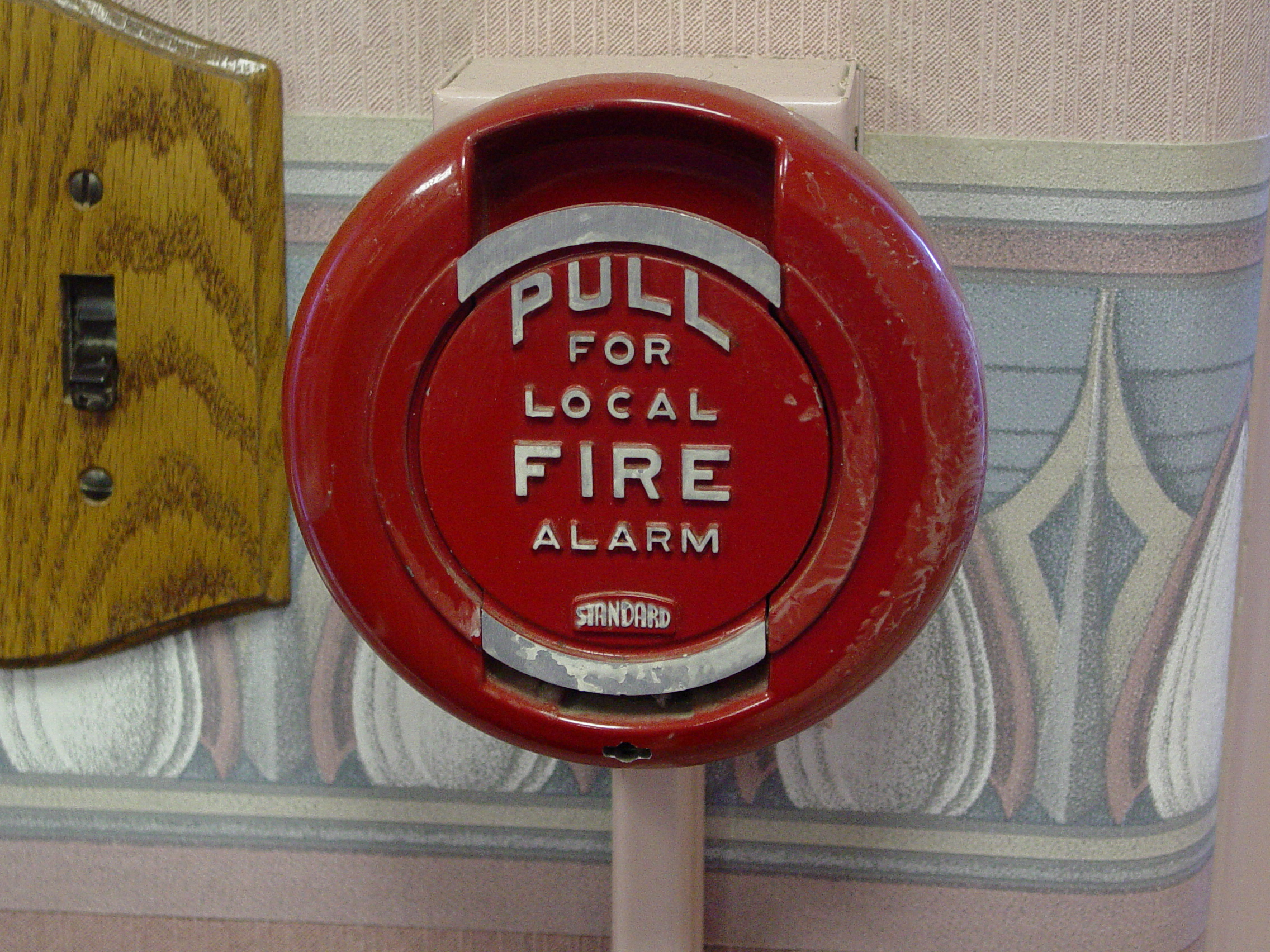
A Standard 200177 fire alarm pull station

The Standard Electric Time Company was a Springfield, Massachusetts company founded in 1884, and was a manufacturer of synchronized clock systems and fire alarm systems. They were the oldest manufacturer of electric clocks in the United States. The company was acquired by Johnson Controls in 1970 and then Faraday in 1978.

== History ==
The company was founded in Waterbury, Connecticut by Charles Warner, the pioneer of the electric clock. The company was later moved to Springfield MA in 1911. Standard quickly became known for its electric clock systems, which were often installed in schools, universities, and other public buildings. These systems consisted of a master clock, which then controlled all secondary clocks. Like many companies during the Great Depression, Standard suffered from financial difficulties throughout the 1930s. In the 1940s during World War II, Standard products were used in many defense projects. In 1950, Standard made a 15,000-square-foot (1,400 m^{2}) addition onto their Springfield plant, and introduced several new product lines, most notably fire alarm systems, fluid analyzer systems, and nurse call systems for use in hospitals. In 1970, it was announced that the company would be sold to Johnson Controls in Milwaukee, Wisconsin. During this period, the company modernized its fire alarm division with the SET/7000, a modular solid-state conventional panel, and later with the SET/7500, a 250-zone multiplex panel in console form that could control fire alarm, security, and building automation systems, along with their light plates and remote lights. In 1978, Johnson Controls sold Standard Electric Time to Faraday. In 1981, Faraday downsized the company substantially, closing all divisions except for standard electric time, and moved it to Tecumseh, Michigan. Faraday is now owned by Siemens, and a small branch office still remains in Springfield.
