= Peukert's law =

Law of capacity in lead-acid batteries

Peukert's law, presented by the German scientist Wilhelm Peukert in 1897, expresses approximately the change in capacity of rechargeable lead–acid batteries at different rates of discharge. As the rate of discharge increases, the battery's available capacity decreases, approximately according to Peukert's law.

== Batteries ==
Manufacturers specify the capacity of a battery at a specified discharge rate. For example, a battery might be rated at 100 A·h when discharged at a rate that will fully discharge the battery in 20 hours (at 5 amperes for this example). If discharged at a faster rate the delivered capacity is less. Peukert's law describes a power relationship between the discharge current (normalized to some base rated current) and delivered capacity (normalized to the rated capacity) over some specified range of discharge currents. If Peukert's constant $k$, the exponent, were equal to unity, the delivered capacity would be independent of the current. For a real battery the exponent is greater than unity, and capacity decreases as discharge rate increases. For a lead–acid battery $k$ is typically between 1.1 and 1.3. For different lead–acid rechargeable battery technologies it generally ranges from 1.05 to 1.15 for VRSLAB AGM batteries, from 1.1 to 1.25 for gel, and from 1.2 to 1.6 for flooded batteries. The Peukert constant varies with the age of the battery, generally increasing (getting worse) with age. Application at low discharge rates must take into account the battery self-discharge current. At very high currents, practical batteries will give less capacity than predicted with a fixed exponent. The equation does not take into account the effect of temperature on battery capacity.

== Formula ==
For a one-ampere discharge rate, Peukert's law is often stated as

$$C_p = I^k t$$

where:

$C_p$ is the capacity at a one-ampere discharge rate, which must be expressed in ampere hours,
$I$ is the actual discharge current (i.e. current drawn from a load) in amperes,
$t$ is the actual time to discharge the battery, which must be expressed in hours.
$k$ is the Peukert constant (dimensionless),

The capacity at a one-ampere discharge rate is not usually given for practical cells. As such, it can be useful to reformulate the law to a known capacity and discharge rate:

$$t = H \left(\frac{C}{I H}\right)^k$$

where:

$H$ is the rated discharge time (in hours),
$C$ is the rated capacity at that discharge rate (in ampere hours),
$I$ is the actual discharge current (in amperes),
$k$ is the Peukert constant (dimensionless),
$t$ is the actual time to discharge the battery (in hours).

Using the above example, if a battery rated for 100 ampere-hours at a 20-hour rate has a Peukert constant of 1.2 and is discharged at a rate of 10 amperes, it would be fully discharged in time $20{\left(\frac{100}{10 \cdot 20}\right)^{1.2}}$, which is approximately 8.7 hours. It would therefore deliver only 87 ampere-hours rather than 100.

Peukert's law can be written as

$$I t = C \left(\frac{C}{I H}\right)^{k-1}$$

giving $I t$, which is the effective capacity at the discharge rate $I$.

Peukert's law, taken literally, would imply that the total discharge reaches a maximum as time goes to infinity and the rate of discharge goes to zero. This is of course impossible, because the battery will still self-discharge internally with or without zero discharge through a load. The self discharge rate depends on the chemistry and ambient temperature.

If the capacity is listed for two discharge rates, the Peukert exponent can be determined algebraically:

$$\frac{C}{C_{0}} = \left(\frac{t}{t_{0}}\right)^{\frac{k-1}{k}}$$

where:

$C$ and $C_0$ are the two capacity values (in ampere hours), and
$t$ and $t_0$ are the corresponding constant-current discharge times (in hours).

Or alternatively, given two discharge current values $I$ and $I_0$:

$$\frac{C}{C_{0}} = \left(\frac{I_0}{I}\right)^{k-1}$$

Peukert's law becomes a key issue in a battery electric vehicle, where batteries rated, for example, at a 20-hour discharge time are used at a much shorter discharge time of about 1 hour. At high load currents the internal resistance of a real battery dissipates significant power, reducing the power (watts) available to the load in addition to the Peukert reduction, delivering less capacity than the simple power law equation predicts.

A 2006 critical study concluded that Peukert's equation could not be used to predict the state of charge of a battery accurately unless it is discharged at a constant current and constant temperature.

== Explanation ==
It is a common misunderstanding that the energy not delivered by the battery due to Peukert's law is "lost" (as heat for example). In fact, once the load is removed, the battery voltage will recover, and more energy can again be drawn out of the battery. This is because the law applies specifically to batteries discharged at constant current down to the cut-off voltage. The battery will no longer be able to deliver that current without falling below the cut-off voltage, so it is considered discharged at that point, despite significant energy still remaining in the battery.

What happens is that the chemical process (diffusion) responsible for transporting active chemicals around the battery progresses at a finite rate, so draining the battery quickly causes the voltage to reach the cut-off level prematurely before all the active material in the battery is used up. Given time, the active material will diffuse through the cell (for example, sulfuric acid in a lead–acid battery will diffuse through the porous lead plates and separators) and be available for further reaction.

For example, consider a battery with a capacity of 200 Ah at the C_{20} rate (C_{20} means the 20-hour rate – i.e. the rate that will fully discharge the battery in 20 hours – which in this case is 10 A).

If this battery is discharged at 10 A, it will last 20 hours, giving the rated capacity of 200 Ah.

However, the same battery discharged at 20 A may only last for 5 hours. Therefore, it only delivered 100 Ah. This means that it will therefore also be (nearly) fully charged again after recharging 100 Ah – while the same battery which was previously discharged with I_{20} = 10 A and lasted 20 hours will be nearly fully charged after recharging 200 Ah.

In fact, a battery which has been discharged at a very high rate will recover over time, and the remaining capacity can be retrieved after the battery has been left at rest for several hours or a day.

The remaining capacity can also be withdrawn by reducing the current. For example, when the battery in the previous example reaches the cut-off voltage at 200 A, tapering the current down as necessary to keep the voltage at the low voltage cut-off value will enable nearly all the missing capacity to be taken from the battery (albeit over a longer period of time).

These effects explain why the voltage of a discharged battery bounces back up after the load is removed, and why it is possible to discharge the battery further (e.g. turning a flashlight on again after exhausting the battery) after a period of time without charging the battery.

== Fire safety ==
Peukert's law brings a certain degree of fire-safety to many battery designs. It limits the maximum output power of the battery. For example, starting a car is safe even if the lead–acid battery dies. The primary fire hazard with lead–acid batteries occurs during over-charging when hydrogen gas is produced. This danger is easily controlled by limiting the available charge voltage, and ensuring ventilation is present during charging to vent any excess hydrogen gas. A secondary danger exists when broken plates inside the battery short out the battery, or reconnect inside the battery causing an internal spark, igniting the hydrogen and oxygen generated inside the battery during very fast discharge.

Discharging batteries at extreme rates can cause thermal runaway. In particular, if the cell develops an internal short, it tends to overheat, release electrolyte, and catch fire. A fire generates additional heat, which can melt adjacent cells and result in additional leakage of the flammable electrolyte. Additionally, a fire can also increase cell temperatures in adjacent cells, and this further increase the available fault currents (and heat). The resultant runaway reactions can be spectacular.

== Limitations ==
Peukert's law is a valuable tool for estimation. However, it has limitations. Among them are:

- The effects of temperature on batteries is not included in the equation.
- Battery age is not considered. The Peukert exponent increases with battery age.
- If calculating for a low discharge rate, the equation does not account for the fact that each battery has a self discharge rate.

In terms of estimation, Peukert's law gets much closer to estimating real world performance of a battery than simple extrapolations of the amp hour rating.
