= Warren S. Johnson =

American college professor

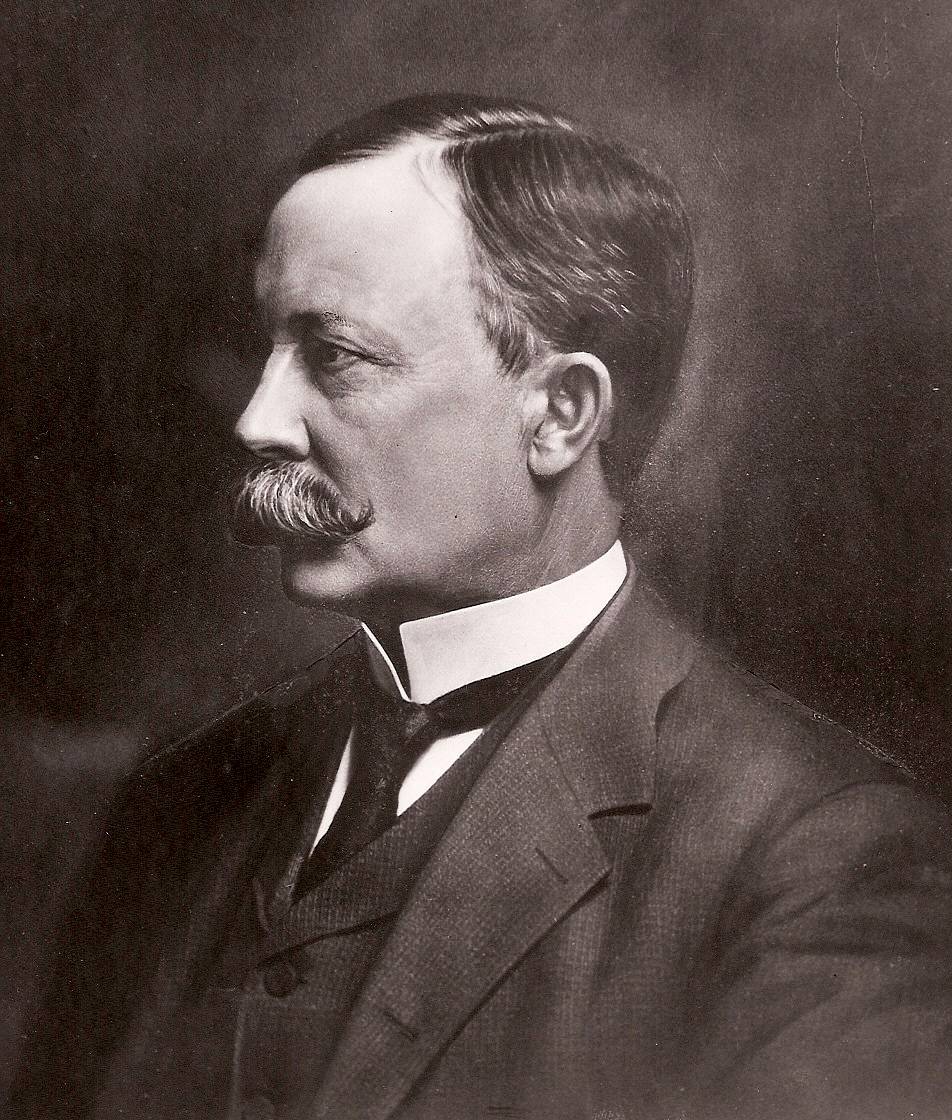
Warren Seymour Johnson

Warren Seymour Johnson (November 6, 1847 – December 5, 1911) was an American college professor who, frustrated by his inability to regulate individual classroom temperatures, invented a multi-zone pneumatic control system for this purpose. Johnson’s system for temperature regulation was adopted worldwide for office buildings, schools, hospitals, and hotels – essentially any large building with multiple rooms that required temperature regulation. To manufacture and market his system, Johnson established the Johnson Electric Service Company, which eventually became Johnson Controls.

== Early life ==
Johnson was born in Leicester, Vermont, on November 6, 1847. His family moved to Wisconsin three years later, eventually settling in Menomonie, Dunn County, Wisconsin. It appears that he had only limited formal education but supplemented it with private study of scientific subjects. He worked for a time as a printer, surveyor, schoolteacher, principal and school superintendent. In 1876, he obtained a teaching position at the State Normal School in Whitewater, now the University of Wisconsin–Whitewater. Five years later, he was named professor of natural science.

== Johnson’s inventions ==
Particularly interested in electricity, Johnson developed a thermostat in 1883, which he deployed at the State Normal School. He called the instrument an "electric tele-thermoscope" in the patent application. It was a bi-metal coiled thermostat with a mercury switch, which could be used to ring a bell to alert the fireman to open or close the heating damper. While not the first bi-metallic thermostat, Johnson received a patent for the device and interested William Plankinton, heir to the Plankinton Packing Company, to provide financial backing to manufacture the device.

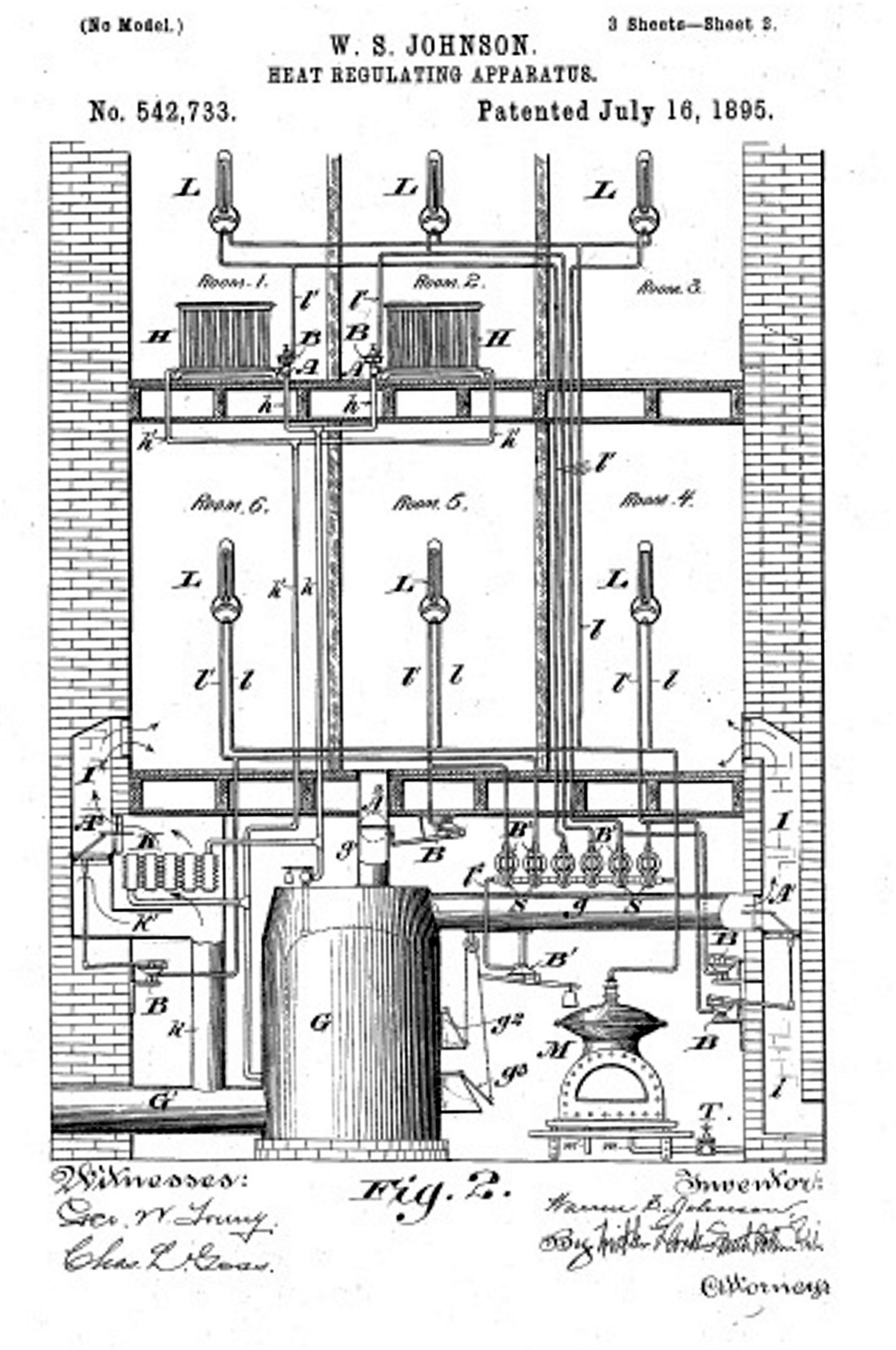
Patent Drawing for Heat Regulating Apparatus - Patent No. 542,733

In 1885, Johnson founded the Johnson Electric Service Company, in Milwaukee, Wisconsin. His most notable contribution to temperature control was the automatic multi-zone temperature control system – a pneumatic system that used a bi-metallic thermostat to control air flow through a nozzle and thereby operate a pilot regulator. The amplified air signal from the regulator controlled in turn a steam or hot water valve on a heat exchanger or a damper of a forced air system. Johnson received a patent for the system in 1895.

Johnson continued to invent additional control devices, as well as products such as chandeliers, springless door locks, puncture-proof pneumatic tires, thermometers, and a hose coupling for providing steam heat to passenger railcars. He also designed pneumatic tower clocks, one of which was built for the Milwaukee City Hall tower.

He experimented for a time with wireless communications, forming the American Wireless Telegraph Company. The company’s exhibit at the Paris Exposition Universelle in 1900 won second prize, beating Guglielmo Marconi's. A test tower was built several miles south of Milwaukee, but the tests were unsuccessful. For about three months, Lee de Forest, who eventually went on to design the audio vacuum tube that provided the breakthrough for radio, worked on the project with Johnson.

Johnson also sought to form an automobile company, introducing first a steam-powered truck and then a line of automobiles using gasoline-powered engines. The company was among the first to receive a contract to deliver mail with a horseless carriage.

He is credited with more than 50 patents. He died on December 5, 1911, in Los Angeles of Bright's disease.
