= Faraday (company) =

- Type: Subsidiary of Siemens
- Industry: Manufacturing
- Founded: 1875
- Defunct: 2015
- Fate: Acquired by Siemens, brand name retired in 2015
- Headquarters: Florham Park, New Jersey, U.S.
- Products: Fire detection and notification devices
- Parent: Siemens

Faraday was a Florham Park, New Jersey company that specialized in fire protection systems.

== History ==
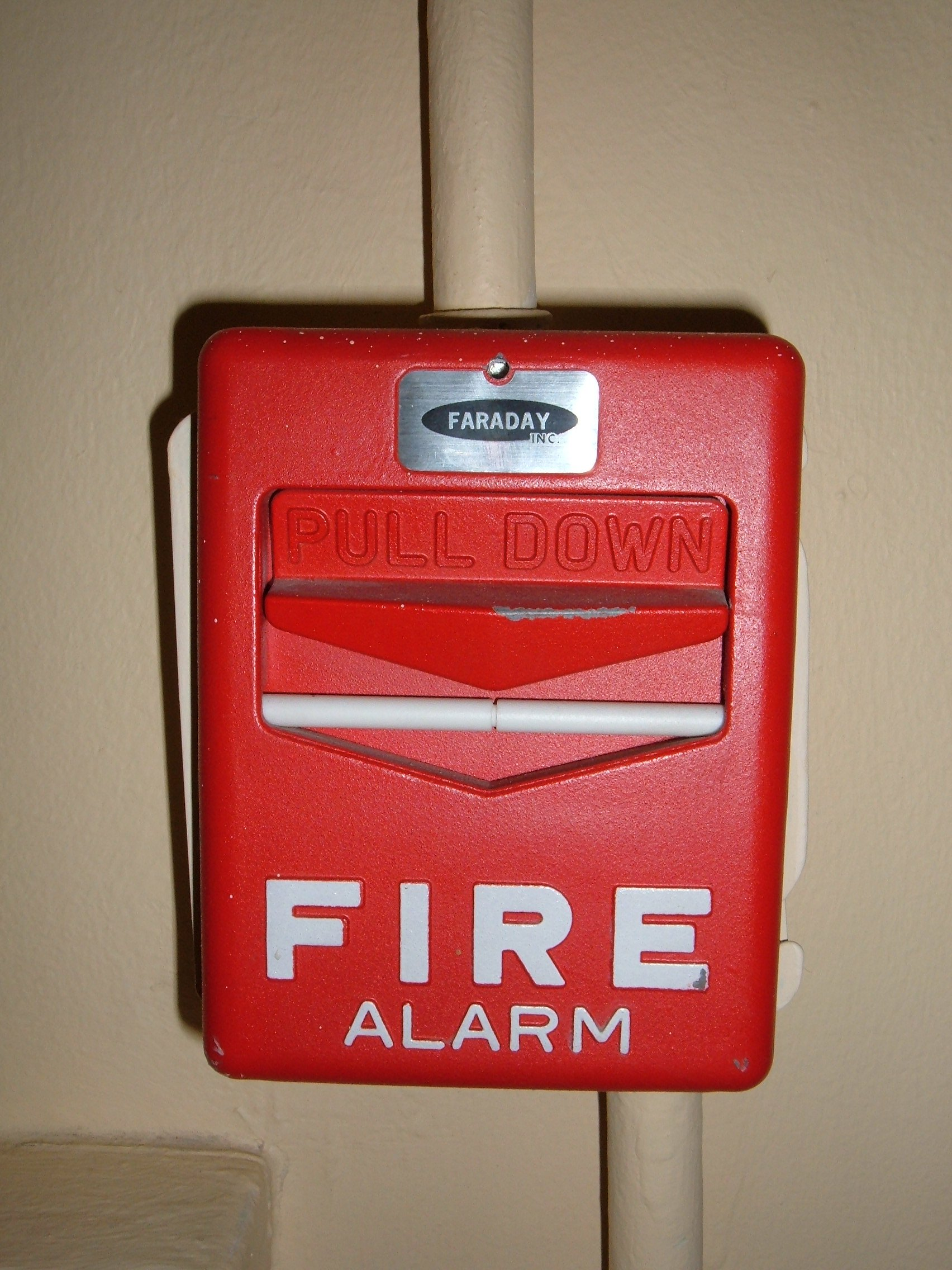
An F1G "Chevron" pull station with the older Faraday logo.

Faraday was founded in 1875 in Brooklyn, New York. In the early 1900s, the company was owned by Stanley & Patterson, an electrical supplies conglomerate. Around this time, Faraday began producing notification appliances, such as bells, horns, buzzers, etc. They also rebranded coded fire alarm stations from Holtzer-Cabot. From the 1930s to the 1960s, Faraday was known as "Sperti-Faraday", and the company moved to Adrian, Michigan. From the late 1960s up until present, many companies rebranded Faraday's popular line of notification appliances, including Simplex, Standard Electric Time Company, Pyrotronics, Gamewell, FCI, and more. In 1978, Faraday bought out Standard Electric Time, and around the same time, moved its location to Tecumseh, Michigan. In 1977, Faraday bought out S.H. Couch, and continued to manufacture the iconic F1G "Chevron" pull station, originally designed by Couch in the 1950s. Siemens currently manufactures the "Chevron" pull station as an addressable version.

== Purchase by Siemens and Wheelock lawsuit ==
In 1995, Faraday was bought by Cerberus Pyrotronics, and in 1998, Cerberus Pyrotronics was bought by Siemens. Faraday then moved to their current Florham Park location. Soon after the buyout, Wheelock responded with a lawsuit against Siemens for patent infringement since they thought the Faraday signals they used were too similar in design to their signals, which Siemens lost to. In 2008, as a result of the lawsuit, Faraday discontinued its entire line of notification appliances for 8 years in favor of Wheelock's line as part of the agreement. However, in 2015, eight years after the lawsuit, Siemens did not restart production of their own notification appliances, sticking with the Wheelock devices. Faraday continued to make fire alarm panels for small-to-mid-size applications, along with its own line of initiating devices until 2015, when Siemens discontinued the Faraday brand and absorbed the company.

== Product line ==
In the 2000s, the company announced its Fire-Smart series of alarm detectors which provide advanced detection of true fire & smoke conditions and eliminate false alarms. The MPC series of intelligent addressable alarm panels utilized the electronic signature of each device to determine alarm, trouble, or maintenance alert status. These panels could only provide six amps of alarm signaling power on the notification appliance circuits; however, both six- and eight-amp power supplies are also available to expand the notification capabilities. The company also offers a line of voice-evacuation systems capable of real-voice recording, redundant amplifiers, over 1,000 monitoring and control points for total control. Programming correlations can define fire alarm or other alert messages. Common uses for alert tones include general evacuation, severe weather messages, or other alerts.
