= Civil Rights Act of 1990 =

Civil rights bill passed by the U.S. Congress, vetoed by President George H. W. Bush

- Long title: An Act To amend the Civil Rights Act of 1964 to restore and strengthen civil rights laws that ban discrimination in employment, and for other purposes.

Legislative history
- Introduced in the Senate as (S. 2104) by Ted Kennedy (D–MA) on February 7, 1990; Committee consideration by Senate Committee on Labor and Human Resources; Passed the Senate on July 18, 1990 (65–34); Passed the House on August 3, 1990 (272–154); Reported by the joint conference committee on October 12, 1990; agreed to by the Senate on October 16, 1990 (62–34) and by the House on October 17, 1990 (273–154); Vetoed by President George H. W. Bush on October 22, 1990

The Civil Rights Act of 1990 (also known as the Kennedy–Hawkins Civil Rights Act) was a bill that, had it been signed into law, would have made it easier for litigants in race or sex discrimination cases to win. It was introduced into the 101st United States Congress on February 7, 1990, by Senator Edward Kennedy (D-MA) in the United States Senate, and by Augustus Hawkins (D-CA) in the House of Representatives. While making its way through Congress, the bill was considered to be civil rights groups' number one legislative priority. Soon before the bill made it to the desk of then-President of the United States George H. W. Bush, it was criticized by the Harvard Law School professor Charles Fried. In a New York Times op-ed, Fried (a ranking member of the Federalist Society who served as Solicitor General in the Reagan administration from 1985-1989), wrote that descriptions of the bill as the most important civil rights legislation in a quarter-century were "a public relations flimflam perpetrated by a cabal of overzealous civil rights plaintiffs' lawyers." He concluded by saying that Bush should "veto this bill in its present form."

On October 22, 1990, President Bush vetoed the bill, claiming that it "employs a maze of highly legalistic language to introduce the destructive force of quotas into our national employment system." The Bush administration argued that the bill's provisions were strict enough that they would give employers "powerful incentives" to adopt quotas. Supporters of the bill argued that, contrary to Bush's claims, the bill would not have led employers to adopt quotas. For example, Benjamin Hooks, the then-executive director of the NAACP, said he was "at a loss" as to why Bush described the legislation as a quota bill. Congress attempted to override his veto on October 24, but their attempt failed in the Senate by one vote to achieve the two-thirds majority required.

The Civil Rights Act of 1991 was enacted the next year and addressed the administration's concerns while still expanding employee rights that the 1990 bill sought to amend, including by introducing the right to jury trials for certain employment law cases, reducing the plaintiff's burden of proof in cases involving mixed motives, and allowing for the recovery of compensatory and punitive damages in employment discrimination cases.
