= United Automobile Workers v. Johnson Controls, Inc. =

- Supreme Court of the United States

Argued October 10, 1990 Decided March 21, 1991
- Full case name: International Union, United Automobile, Aerospace & Agricultural Implement Workers Of America, UAW, et al. vs. Johnson Controls, Inc.
- Docket no.: 89-1215
- Citations: 499 U.S. 187 (more) 111 S. Ct. 1196; 113 L. Ed. 2d 158
- Argument: Oral argument
- Opinion announcement: Opinion announcement

Case history
- Prior: 680 F. Supp. 309 (E.D. Wis. 1988); affirmed, 886 F.2d 871 (7th Cir. 1989); cert. granted, 494 U.S. 1055 (1990).

Holding
- Title VII, as amended by the Pregnancy Discrimination Act of 1978, forbids sex-specific fetal-protection policies, as incapability of becoming pregnant is not a "bona fide occupational qualification."

Court membership
- Chief Justice William Rehnquist Associate Justices Byron White · Thurgood Marshall; Harry Blackmun · John P. Stevens; Sandra Day O'Connor · Antonin Scalia; Anthony Kennedy · David Souter

Case opinions
- Majority: Blackmun, joined by Marshall, Stevens, O'Connor, Souter
- Concurrence: White (in part and in judgment), joined by Rehnquist, Kennedy
- Concurrence: Scalia (in judgment)

Laws applied
- Pregnancy Discrimination Act of 1978

United Automobile Workers v. Johnson Controls, Inc., 499 U.S. 187 (1991), was a decision by the Supreme Court of the United States establishing that private sector policies prohibiting women from knowingly working in potentially hazardous occupations are discriminatory and in violation of Title VII and the Pregnancy Discrimination Act of 1978. The case revolved around Johnson Controls' policy of excluding fertile women from working in battery manufacturing jobs because batteries contain high amounts of lead, which poses health risks, in particular to people's reproductive systems (both men and women) and to fetuses. At the time the case was heard, it was considered one of the most important sex-discrimination cases since the passage of Title VII.

== Opinion of the Court ==
The majority opinion by Justice Blackmun held that that Title VII prohibits gender–specific fetal protection policies. Hence based on that statute, the Court decided against Johnson Controls by concluding that the company's fetal protection policy contravened Title VII of the Civil Rights Act of 1964, as amended by the PDA; and the company's gender-specific rule was biased and inequitable because it permitted fertile men, but not fertile women, to decide whether to work in jobs subjected to lead exposure while manufacturing batteries. The court rejected Johnson Controls' argument that their policy fell under the Bona Fide Occupational Qualification (BFOQ) defense because the protection of employees' fetuses was not an essential part of the business's operation.
