= State of Wisconsin Investment Board =

State agency to manage state trust funds

- Industry: asset management
- Founded: 1951
- Headquarters: Madison, Wisconsin, United States
- Key people: Executive Director/Chief Investment Officer: Edwin Denson
- Website: www.swib.state.wi.us

The State of Wisconsin Investment Board (SWIB) is an independent agency of the U.S. state of Wisconsin responsible for managing the assets of the Wisconsin Retirement System, the State Investment Fund (SIF), and other state trust funds. As of December 31, 2024, SWIB managed over $162 billion in assets.

Created in 1951, the SWIB is governed by a Board of Trustees consisting of nine members meeting specific membership requirements under section 15.76 of the statutes. Trustees have a fiduciary responsibility to act solely in the best interest of the funds under management. They appoint the executive director/chief investment officer and the director of internal audit. Trustee responsibilities include establishing asset allocation, investment guidelines, and performance benchmarks.

Edwin Denson was appointed the executive director/chief investment officer in April 2021.

== Assets under management ==
=== Wisconsin Retirement System (WRS) ===
The Wisconsin Retirement System (WRS) consistently ranks among the 10 largest public pension funds in the U.S. Participants include current and former employees of Wisconsin’s state agencies and most local governments other than the City of Milwaukee and Milwaukee County. Investing WRS assets is the responsibility of the State of Wisconsin Investment Board (SWIB). Individual accounts and benefits under the Wisconsin Retirement System (WRS) are managed by the Department of Employee Trust Funds (ETF). Contributions made to the WRS by employees and their employers are invested by the Investment Board. The accumulated funds in the retirement system trusts are used to pay retirement benefits. The WRS has two funds: the Core Fund, a fully diversified fund, and the Variable Fund, an all-stock fund.

=== State Investment Fund ===
The State Investment Fund (SIF) is a pool of cash balances of various state and local governmental units created by the State under section 25.14 of the statutes. It includes retirement trust funds cash balances pending longer-term investment and is the State's cash management fund. By pooling idle cash balances of all state funds, it provides the State's general fund and 47 participating state agencies with the needed liquidity for operating expenses. Over 1,000 local units of government also deposit revenues in the SIF until they are needed. These funds are referred to as the Local Government Investment Pool (LGIP). The Wisconsin Department of Administration administers the accounts of LGIP members and additional information, including rates, are available from DOA's LGIP home page. The objectives of the Fund are to provide liquidity, safety of principal and competitive rates of return. The Fund is invested primarily in obligations of the US government and its agencies, and high-quality commercial bank and corporate debt obligations.

=== Separately managed funds ===
SWIB is responsible for investing four other funds established by the State. Each Fund is managed separately and investments are made according to the purpose and risk profile of each trust.

The Injured Patients and Families Compensation Fund was created by statute to provide excess medical malpractice coverage for Wisconsin health care providers. The program is administered by the Office of the Commissioner of Insurance. The Fund is invested in long-term and short-term fixed income investments. Cash flows are generated through coupon and maturity payments to meet short-term liability payments. Longer liability payments are immunized. The portfolio is periodically rebalanced based on projected cash needs by the Board of Governors of the Patients Compensation Fund.

The State Life Insurance Fund is a state-sponsored life insurance program for the benefit of Wisconsin residents. It was established with the passage of a law on June 7, 1911. The applicant must be a state resident at the time of application for coverage through the Fund. The Fund operates on a nonprofit basis and receives no subsidies from the state. It is not permitted to use commissioned agents, does not advertise, and is exempt from federal income tax. The Fund has a total return objective, emphasizing fixed income investments.

The Historical Society Trust Fund helps the state Historical Society's goal to promote a wider appreciation of the American heritage with an emphasis on the collection, advancement, and dissemination of knowledge of the history of Wisconsin and the region. The Historical Society's investment portfolio invests the endowment funds with a total return objective and emphasizes common stock investments.

The University of Wisconsin System Trust Funds consist primarily of monies that have been gifted directly to a UW institution rather than to one of the separate, supporting foundations. The Trust Funds Office works externally with donors and other related parties, and internally with the benefiting campuses and colleges, to facilitate the receipt and proper use (compliant with donor terms and conditions) of all gifts and bequests. The majority of the trust funds are invested by SWIB.

== History ==
Created on June 28, 1951, by the signing of a Wisconsin State Senate bill into law, SWIB has been supported by government leaders and system participants ever since. It was spearheaded by public policymakers who could see the state’s uninvested cash balances sitting idle and union officials who were concerned about the diminishing value of contributions made to public worker pensions.

SWIB became one of the first pension funds to include a private placements investment program in 1965. In 1989, SWIB opened up to international markets. In 1995, SWIB moved into developing countries as former communist states in Eastern Europe were opening their borders and their economies. In 1999, SWIB started a venture capital program focused on Wisconsin and the Midwest. More recently, SWIB established a global portfolio and added leverage and hedge funds. In 2021, SWIB celebrated its 70th anniversary.

== Awards and recognition ==
In 2021, SWIB was recognized with two industry honors - Team of the Year and Partnership of the Year - at the 4th Annual Institutional Investor Allocators' Choice Awards. The organization was previously recognized as Team of the Year in 2020.

SWIB's Executive Director/Chief Investment Officer Edwin Denson was named the winner of the Chief Investment Officer (CIO) 2022 Industry Innovation Award in the category for public defined benefit pension funds with assets greater than $100 billion.
