= VRLA battery =

Type of lead-acid battery

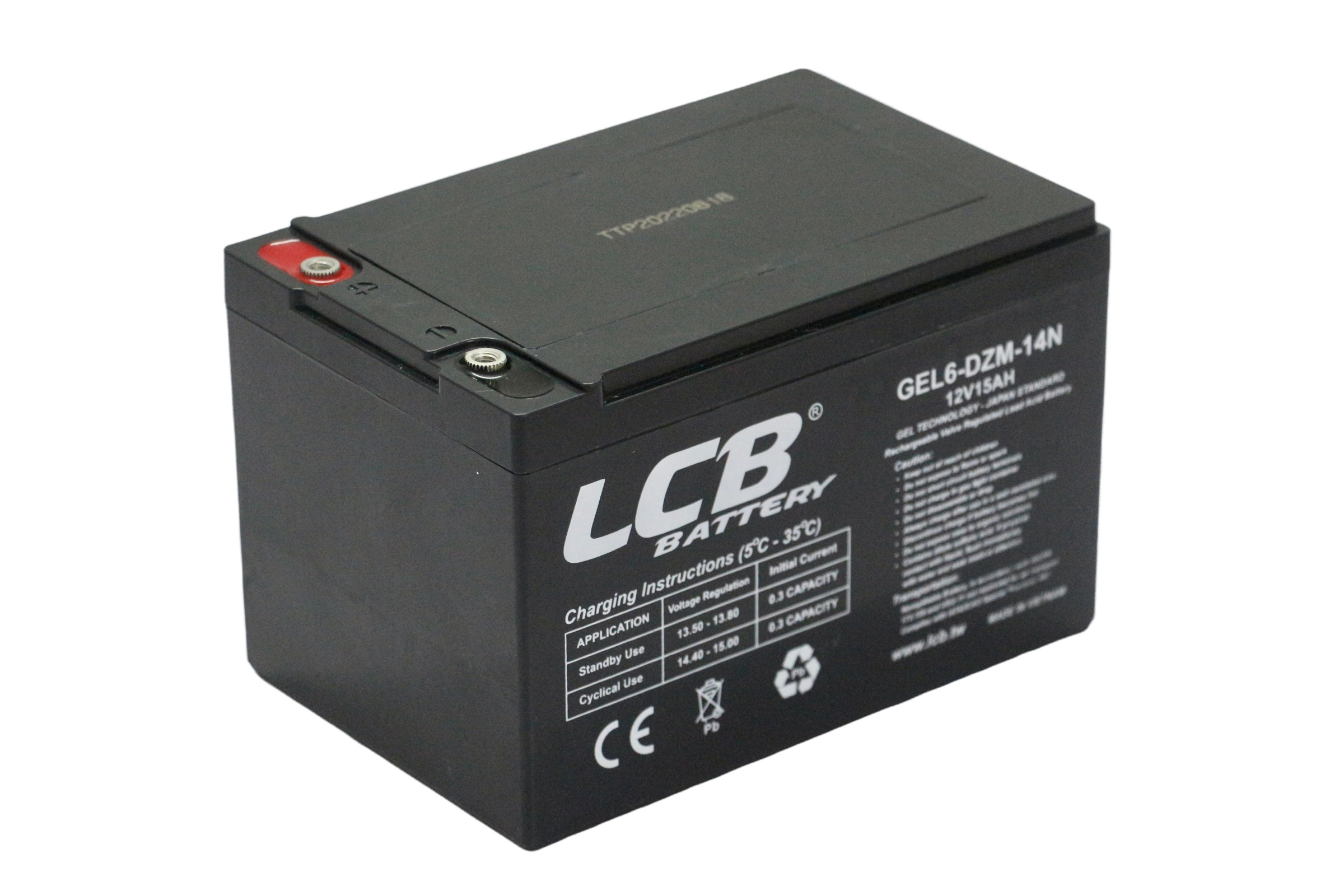
A 12V VRLA battery, with gel technology inside for deep-cycle application

A valve regulated lead–acid (VRLA) battery, commonly known as a sealed lead–acid (SLA) battery, is a type of lead–acid battery characterized by a limited amount of electrolyte ("starved" electrolyte) absorbed in a plate separator or formed into a gel, proportioning of the negative and positive plates so that oxygen recombination is facilitated within the cell, and the presence of a relief valve that retains the battery contents independent of the position of the cells.

There are two primary types of VRLA batteries: absorbent glass mat (AGM) and gel cell (gel battery). Gel cells add silica dust to the electrolyte, forming a thick putty-like gel; AGM batteries include fiberglass mesh between the battery plates, which contains the electrolyte and separates the plates. Both types of VRLA batteries offer advantages and disadvantages compared to flooded vented lead–acid (VLA) batteries or each other.

Due to their construction, the gel cell and AGM types of VRLA can be mounted in any orientation and do not require constant maintenance. The term "maintenance-free" is a misnomer, as VRLA batteries still require cleaning and regular functional testing. They are widely used in large portable electrical devices, off-grid power systems (including uninterruptible power systems), motor vehicles (as traction batteries for light electric vehicles such as golf carts and as starter or auxiliary batteries for heavier vehicles) and similar roles, where large amounts of storage are needed at a lower cost than other low-maintenance technologies like lithium ion.

== History ==
The first lead-acid gel battery was invented by Elektrotechnische Fabrik Sonneberg in 1934. The modern gel, or VRLA, battery was invented by Otto Jache of Sonnenschein in 1957.

The first AGM cell was the Cyclon, patented by Gates Rubber Corporation in 1972 and now produced by EnerSys.

The Cyclon was a spiral-wound cell with thin lead foil electrodes. A number of manufacturers adopted the technology to implement it in cells with conventional flat plates. In the mid-1980s, two UK companies, Chloride Group and Tungstone Products, simultaneously introduced "ten-year life" AGM batteries in capacities up to 400 Ah, stimulated by a British Telecom specification for backup batteries to support new digital exchanges.

In the same period, Gates acquired another UK company, Varley, specializing in aircraft and military batteries. Varley adapted the Cyclon lead foil technology to produce flat-plate batteries with exceptional high rate output. These gained approval for a variety of aircraft, including the BAE 125 and 146 business jets, the Harrier jump jet and its derivative the AV-8B, and some F16 variants, as the first alternatives to then standard nickel–cadmium (Ni-Cd) batteries.

== Basic principle ==
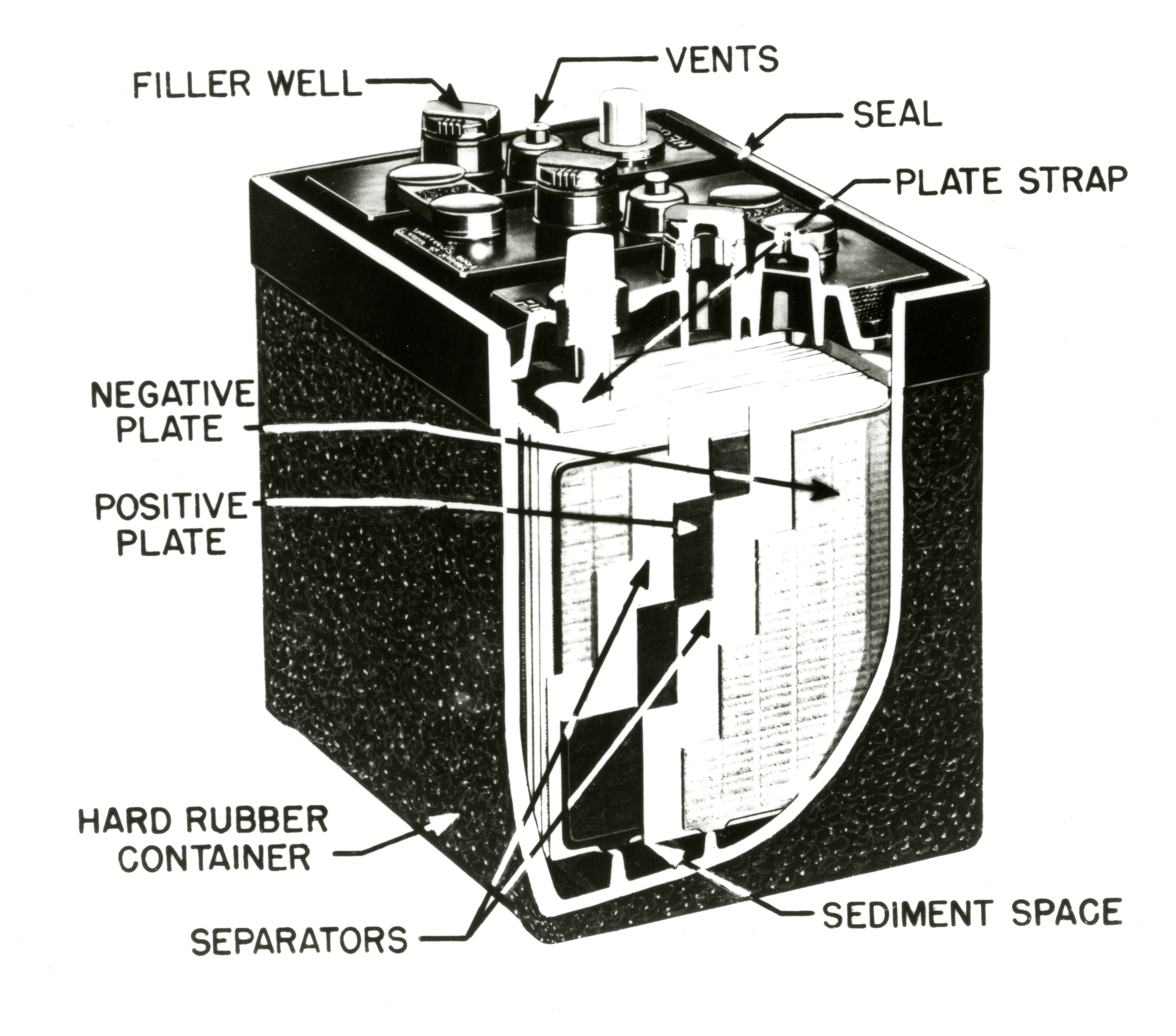
Cutaway view of a 1953 automotive battery.

Lead-acid cells consist of two plates of lead, which serve as electrodes, suspended in an electrolyte consisting of diluted sulfuric acid. VRLA cells have the same chemistry except the electrolyte is immobilized. In AGMs, this is accomplished with a fiberglass mat; in gel batteries or "gel cells", the electrolyte is in the form of a paste-like gel created by adding silica and other gelling agents to the electrolyte.

When a cell discharges, the lead and diluted acid undergo a chemical reaction that produces lead sulfate and water. When a cell is subsequently charged, the lead sulfate and water are turned back into lead and acid. In all lead-acid battery designs, charging current must be adjusted to match the ability of the battery to absorb the energy. If the charging current is too great, electrolysis will occur, decomposing water into hydrogen and oxygen, in addition to the intended conversion of lead sulfate and water into lead dioxide, lead, and sulfuric acid (the reverse of the discharge process). If these gases are allowed to escape, as in a conventional flooded cell, the battery will need to have water (or electrolyte) added from time to time. In contrast, VRLA batteries retain generated gases within the battery as long as the pressure remains within safe levels. Under normal operating conditions, the gases can then recombine within the battery itself, sometimes with the help of a catalyst, and no additional electrolyte is needed. However, if the pressure exceeds safety limits, safety valves open to allow the excess gases to escape, and in doing so regulate the pressure back to safe levels (hence "valve regulated" in "VRLA").

== Construction ==
Each cell in a VRLA battery has a pressure relief valve that will activate when the battery starts building pressure of hydrogen gas, generally a result of being recharged.

The cell covers typically have gas diffusers built into them, which allow safe dispersal of any excess hydrogen that may be formed during overcharge. They are not permanently sealed but are designated to be maintenance-free. They can be oriented in any manner, unlike normal lead-acid batteries, which must be kept upright to avoid acid spills and to keep the plates' orientation vertical. Cells may be operated with the plates horizontal (pancake style), which may improve cycle life.

== Absorbent glass mat (AGM) ==
AGM batteries differ from flooded lead-acid batteries in that the electrolyte is held in the glass mats, as opposed to freely flooding the plates. Thin glass fibers are woven into a mat to increase the surface area enough to hold a sufficient amount of electrolyte on the cells for their lifetime. The fibers that compose the fine glass mat do not absorb and are not affected by the acidic electrolyte. These mats are wrung out 2–5% after being soaked in acids just prior to finish manufacturing.

The plates in an AGM battery may be of any shape. Some are flat, whereas others are bent or rolled. Both deep-cycle and starting type of AGM batteries are built into a rectangular case according to Battery Council International (BCI) battery code specifications.

AGM batteries are more resistant to self-discharging than conventional batteries within a wide range of temperatures.

As with lead-acid batteries, in order to maximize the life of an AGM battery, it is important to follow the manufacturer's charging specifications. The use of a voltage-regulated charger is recommended. There is a direct correlation between the depth of discharge (DOD) and the cycle life of the battery, with cycle life between 500 and 1300 cycles, depending on DOD.

== Gel battery ==
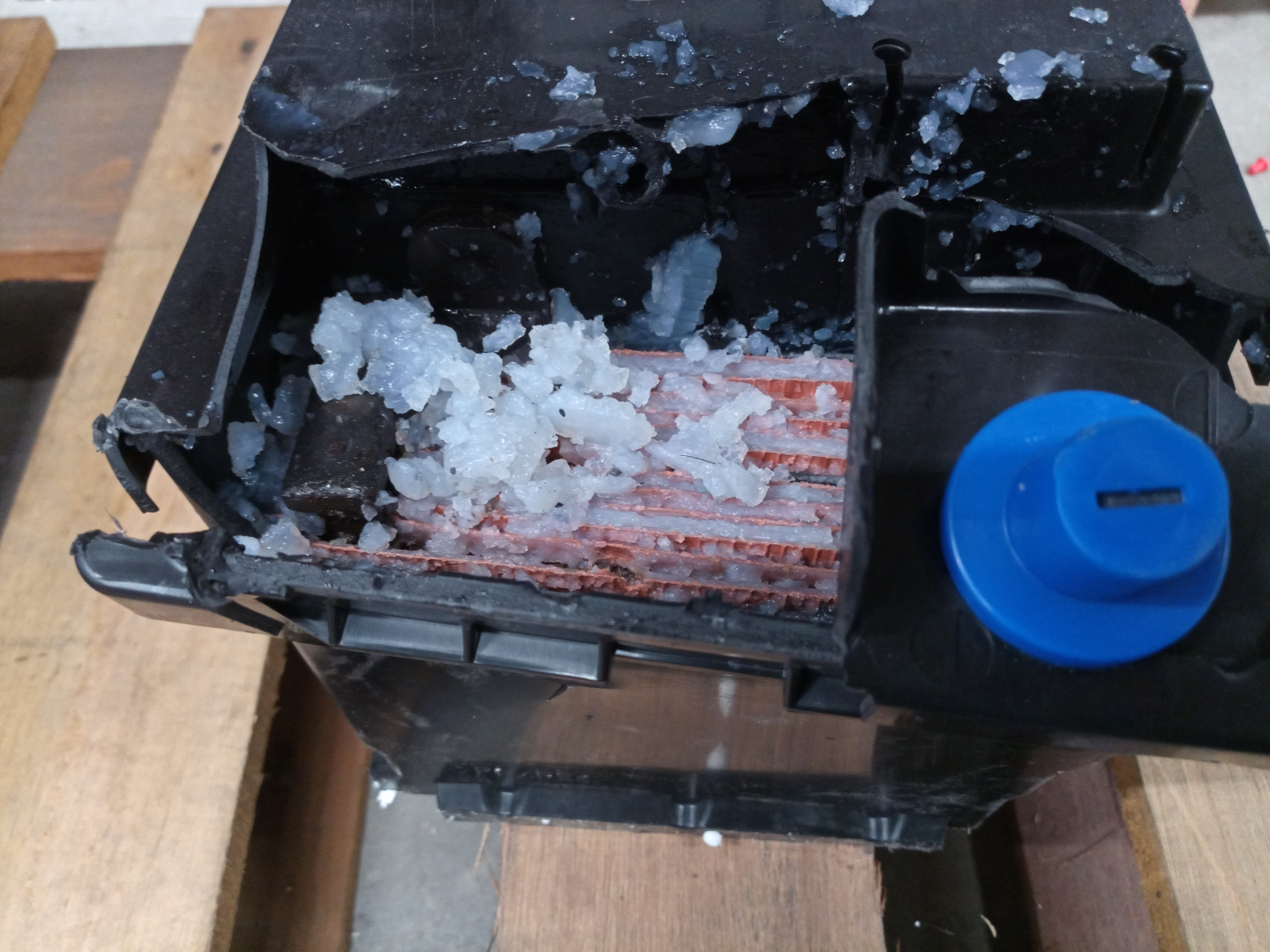
Broken gel battery with white gobbets of the gelated electrolyte on the plates.

Originally a kind of gel battery was produced in the early 1990s for portable valve (tube) radio LT supply (2, 4, or 6V) by adding silica to the sulfuric acid. By this time, the glass case was being replaced by celluloid, and later, in the 1930s, other plastics. Earlier "wet" cells in glass jars used special valves to allow tilt from vertical to one horizontal direction, in 9000 to 2028 or 1932. The gel cells were less likely to leak when the portable set was handled roughly.

A modern gel battery is a VRLA battery with a gelated electrolyte; the sulfuric acid is mixed with fumed silica, which makes the resulting mass gel-like and immobile. Unlike a flooded wet cell lead-acid battery, these batteries do not need to be kept upright. Gel batteries reduce the electrolyte evaporation, spillage (and subsequent corrosion problems) common to the wet cell battery, and boast greater resistance to shock and vibration. Chemically, they are almost the same as wet (non-sealed) batteries except that the antimony in the lead plates is replaced by calcium, and gas recombination can take place.

=== AGM vs. gel ===
While both absorbent glass mat (AGM) and gel batteries are categorized as valve-regulated lead–acid (VRLA) batteries and are commonly used in vehicles and backup power systems, they differ in several key performance aspects. The comparison below highlights major differences based on characteristics such as charge speed, vibration resistance, and deep cycle capability.

Differences between AGM and gel batteries
Feature	AGM	Gel
Charging speed	Fast	Slow
Discharge rate	High	Low
Durability in vibration	Excellent	Good
Performance in extreme heat	Good	Excellent
Deep-cycle lifespan	Moderate	Long
Cost	Lower	Higher

== Applications ==
Many modern motorcycles and all-terrain vehicles (ATVs) use AGM batteries to reduce the likelihood of acid spilling during cornering, vibration, or after accidents, and for packaging reasons. The lighter, smaller battery can be installed at an odd angle if needed for the design of the motorcycle. Due to the higher manufacturing costs compared with flooded lead-acid batteries, AGM batteries are used on luxury vehicles. As vehicles become heavier and equipped with more electronic devices such as navigation and stability control, AGM batteries are being employed to lower vehicle weight and provide better electrical reliability compared with flooded lead-acid batteries.

5 series BMWs from March 2007 incorporate AGM batteries in conjunction with devices for recovering brake energy using regenerative braking and computer control to ensure that the alternator charges the battery when the car is decelerating. Vehicles used in auto racing may use AGM batteries due to their vibration resistance. AGM batteries are also commonly used in classic vehicles, since they are much less likely to leak electrolyte, which could damage hard-to-replace body panels.

Deep-cycle AGMs are also commonly used in off-grid solar power and wind power installations as an energy storage bank and in large-scale amateur robotics, such as the FIRST and IGVC competitions.

AGM batteries are routinely chosen for remote sensors such as ice monitoring stations in the Arctic. AGM batteries, due to their lack of free electrolyte, will not crack and leak in these cold environments.

VRLA batteries are used extensively in power wheelchairs and mobility scooters, as the extremely low gas and acid output makes them much safer for indoor use. VRLA batteries are also used in uninterruptible power supplies as a backup when the electrical power goes off.

VRLA batteries are also the standard power source in sailplanes, due to their ability to withstand a variety of flight attitudes and a relatively large ambient temperature range. However, charging regimes must be adapted with varying temperatures.

Li-Ion batteries are used in the US Nuclear Submarine fleet, due to their power density, elimination of gassing, reduced maintenance, and enhanced safety.

AGM and gel-cell batteries are also used for recreational marine purposes, with AGM being more commonly available. AGM deep-cycle marine batteries are offered by a number of suppliers. They typically are favored for their low-maintenance and spill proof qualities, although they are generally considered a less cost-effective solution relative to traditional flooded cells.

In telecommunications applications, VRLA batteries that comply with criteria in Telcordia Technologies requirements document GR-4228, Valve-Regulated Lead-Acid (VRLA) Battery String Certification Levels Based on Requirements for Safety and Performance, are recommended for deployment in the Outside Plant at locations such as Controlled Environmental Vaults, Electronic Equipment Enclosures, and huts, and in uncontrolled structures such as cabinets. Relative to VRLA in telecommunications, the use of VRLA Ohmic Measurement Type Equipment (OMTE) and OMTE-like measurement equipment is a fairly new process to evaluate telecommunications battery plants. The proper use of ohmic test equipment allows battery testing without the need to remove batteries from service to perform costly and time-consuming discharge tests.

== Comparison with flooded lead–acid cells ==
VRLA gel and AGM batteries offer several advantages compared with VRLA flooded lead-acid and conventional lead–acid batteries. The battery can be mounted in any position, since the valves only operate on over-pressure faults. Since the battery system is designed to be recombinant and eliminate the emission of gases on overcharge, room ventilation requirements are reduced, and no acid fumes are emitted during normal operation. Flooded-cell gas emissions are of little consequence in all but the smallest confined areas and pose very little threat to a domestic user, so a wet-cell battery designed for longevity gives lower costs per kWh. In a gel battery, the volume of free electrolyte that could be released on damage to the case or venting is very small. There is no need (or ability) to check the level of electrolyte or to top up water lost due to electrolysis, thus reducing inspection and maintenance requirements. Wet-cell batteries can be maintained by a self-watering system or by topping up every three months. The requirement to add distilled water is normally caused by overcharging. A well-regulated system should not require top-up more often than every three months.

=== All lead–acid batteries—charging requirements ===
An underlying disadvantage with all lead–acid (LA) batteries is the requirement for a relatively long recharge cycle time arising from an inherent three-stage charging process: bulk charge, absorption charge, and (maintenance) float charge stages. All lead-acid batteries, irrespective of type, are quick to bulk charge to about 70% of capacity, during which the battery will accept a large current input, determined at a voltage setpoint, within a few hours (with a charge source capable of supplying the design C-rate bulk stage current for a given Ah battery).

However, they then require a longer time spent in the current-tapering-off intermediate absorption charge stage after the initial bulk charge, when the LA battery charge acceptance rate gradually reduces and the battery will not accept a higher C-rate. When the absorption stage voltage setpoint is reached (and charge current has tapered off), the charger switches to a float voltage setpoint at a very low C-rate to maintain the battery's fully charged state indefinitely (the float stage offsets the battery's normal self-discharge over time).

If the charger fails to supply a sufficient absorption stage charge duration and C-rate (it 'plateaus' or times out, a common fault of cheap solar chargers) and a suitable float charge profile, the battery's capacity and longevity will be substantially reduced.

To ensure maximum life, a lead-acid battery should be fully recharged as soon after a discharge cycle as possible to prevent sulfation, and kept at a full charge level by a float source when stored or idle (or stored dry new from the factory, an uncommon practice today).

When working a discharge cycle, a lead–acid battery should be kept at a depth-of-discharge (DOD) of less than 90%, ideally no more than 10-20% DOD; a true LA deep-cycle battery can be taken to a lower DOD (even an occasional 100%), but these greater DOD cycles always impose a longevity price.

Lead–acid battery lifetime cycles will vary with the care given, and with the best care, they may achieve 500 to 1,000 cycles. With less careful use, a lifetime as few as 100 cycles might be expected (all dependent upon the use environment too).

=== Charging sealed batteries ===
Because of calcium added to its plates to reduce water loss, a sealed AGM or gel battery recharges more quickly than a flooded lead–acid battery of either VRLA or conventional design. Compared to flooded batteries, VRLA batteries are more vulnerable to thermal runaway during abusive charging. The electrolyte cannot be tested by hydrometer to diagnose improper charging that can reduce battery life.

=== Comparison summary ===
AGM automobile batteries are typically about twice the price of flooded-cell batteries in a given BCI size group; gel batteries are as much as five times the price.

AGM and gel VRLA batteries:

- Have a shorter recharge time than flooded lead-acid batteries;
- Can tolerate overcharging (overcharging);
- Have a shorter useful life compared to properly maintained wet-cell batteries;
- Discharge significantly less hydrogen gas;
- Are by nature safer for the environment and safer to use;
- Can be used or positioned in any orientation.

== See also ==
- List of battery types
- Sand battery
- Peukert's law – Law of capacity in lead-acid batteries
