= Fetal protection policies in the United States =

Fetal protection policies in the United States are various private sector rules intended to protect women's reproductive health and the health of developing fetuses in the workplace. These policies have evolved in response to the nature of many modern businesses, which use toxic chemicals or ionizing radiation during ordinary business and production activities. These policies have also evolved based on the liability a given business entity might incur, for example, for causing sterility or damage to an otherwise healthy fetus during pregnancy.

These policies were highlighted in the national media in the early 1990s when the U.S. Supreme Court reviewed a lower federal appellate court's decision in UAW v. Johnson Controls, Inc.. Also, scholarly journals have discussed these policies before and after the Johnson Controls case. The U.S. Supreme Court held that these policies violate Title VII of the 1964 Civil Rights Act as amended by the Pregnancy Discrimination Act of 1978 by promoting gender discrimination.
