= Greater Milwaukee Committee =

- Abbreviation: GMC
- Type: Nonprofit organization
- Purpose: Civic Improvement, Education Reform, Infrastructure
- Headquarters: Milwaukee, Wisconsin
- Region served: Wisconsin
- Website: www.gmconline.org

The Greater Milwaukee Committee is a nongovernmental civic organization dedicated to growing the cultural and economic base of the Milwaukee metropolitan area. The League is located in Milwaukee, Wisconsin.
