= Sunvalley Group =

Chinese consumer electronics company

- Type: Private
- Industry: Engineering, Manufacturing
- Founded: May 18, 2007
- Headquarters: Shenzhen, People's Republic of China
- Area served: worldwide
- Products: power bank Bluetooth headphone Bluetooth speaker LED lamp
- Website: www.sunvalleytek.com

Sunvalley Group (Chinese: 泽宝集团), previously known as Sunvalleytek International Inc., is a Chinese consumer electronics company founded in 2007 and headquartered in Shenzhen.

In addition to its headquarters in Shenzhen, the company has offices in San Francisco, Tokyo, Singapore, and Hamburg. It owns six consumer brands, including RAVPower, HooToo, Sable, TaoTronics, VAVA, and Anjou.

== Brands ==
- RAVPower: chargers and powerbanks
- TaoTronics: Bluetooth headphones, Bluetooth speakers, and LED lamps.
- HooToo: small electronics and accessories for smartphones and tablets
- Sable: pillows and bedroom furniture.
- VAVA: audio devices, such as speakers, and car cameras
- Anjou: skin and body products

== Amazon Ban ==
In June 2021 Amazon removed the Sunvalley brands RavPower, TaoTronics and Vava from its platform, seemingly for ignoring Amazon’s rules.
