= Battery regenerator =

Battery maintenance device

A battery regenerator is a device that restores capacity to lead-acid batteries, extending their effective lifespan. They are also known as desulphators, reconditioners or pulse conditioning devices.

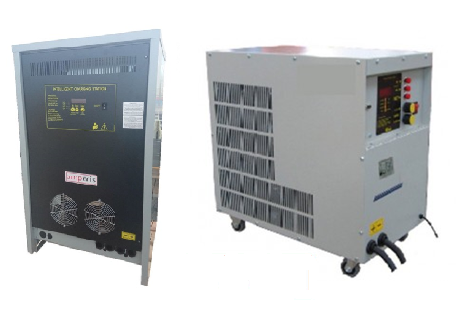
Battery regenerator

When batteries are stored in an uncharged state for an extended period, lead-sulfur deposits form and harden on the lead plates inside the battery. This causes what is known as a sulfated battery which will no longer charge to its original capacity. Regenerators send pulses of electric current through the battery, which in some cases may cause the sulfate to flake off the plates and eventually dissolve.

== Background ==
Conventional lead–acid batteries consist of a number of plates of lead and lead dioxide suspended in a cell filled with weak sulfuric acid. Lead oxide reacts with the sulfur and oxygen in the acid to give up an electron, leaving the plate positively charged and producing lead sulfate. Lead reacts with the acid by taking in two electrons, leaving it negative while also producing lead sulfate. The two chemical processes continue as long as an external circuit is available to allow the electrons to flow back into the positive plates, but reaches equilibrium quickly when the battery is disconnected from the circuit. Each complete reaction produces about 2.11V. A typical 12V battery consists of six individual "cells" wired together in a single box, producing 12.66V when fully charged.

As a battery is discharged the density of lead sulfate in solution increases. In common designs, it reaches a critical density when discharged to about 75% depth of discharge, or below. For instance, a 12V battery with a 100 ampere hour (Ah) capacity will reach this density when 25 Ah (300 Wh) or more have been drawn from the battery. At this point, the lead sulfate will begin to precipitate out of solution onto the battery plates, forming a spongy film. If the battery is immediately recharged, the film will dissolve back into the acid.

If the battery is stored or repeatedly operated in this partially charged state for an extended period, the film will slowly crystallize into a solid. This process of "sulfation" takes time, so it only has a chance to build to significant levels if the battery is repeatedly discharged below this critical level. There are numerous other conditions that can lead to the same problem developing.

Batteries are also prone to self-discharge. If a battery is left disconnected, any internal charge will drain away slowly and eventually reach the critical point. From then on the film will develop and thicken. This is the reason batteries will be found to charge poorly or not at all if left in storage for a long period of time.

== Chargers and sulfation ==
Conventional battery chargers use a one-, two-, or three-stage process to recharge the battery, with a switched-mode power supply including more stages in order to fill the battery more rapidly and completely. Common to almost all chargers, including non-switched models, is the middle stage, normally known as "absorption". In this mode the charger holds a steady voltage slightly above that of a full battery, in order to push current into the cells. As the battery fills, its internal voltage rises towards the fixed voltage being supplied to it, and the rate of current flow slows. Eventually the charger will turn off when the current drops below a pre-set threshold.

A sulfated battery has higher electrical resistance than an unsulfated battery of identical construction. As related by Ohm's law, current is the ratio of voltage to resistance, so a sulfated battery will have lower current flow. As the charging process continues, such a battery will reach the charger's preset cut-off more rapidly, long before it has had time to accept a complete charge. In this case the battery charger indicates the charge cycle is complete, but the battery actually holds very little energy. To the user, it appears that the battery is dying.

== Regeneration ==
The lead sulfate layer can be dissolved back into solution by applying much higher voltages. Normally, running high voltage into a battery will cause it to rapidly heat and potentially cause thermal runaway, which may cause it to explode. Some battery conditioners use short pulses of high voltage, too short to cause significant heating, but long enough to reverse the crystallization process.

Any metal structure, such as a battery, will have some parasitic inductance and some parasitic capacitance. These will resonate with each other, and something the size of a battery will usually resonate at a few megahertz. This process is sometimes called "ringing". However, the electrochemical processes found in batteries have time constants on the order of seconds and will not be affected by megahertz frequencies. There are some websites which advertise "battery desulfators" running at megahertz frequencies.

Depending on the size of the battery, the desulfation process can take from 48 hours to weeks to complete. During this period the battery is also trickle charged to continue reducing the amount of lead sulfur in solution. Commercial regenerators often support multiple batteries to provide parallel operation to improve throughput.
