= IUoU battery charging =

Lead-acid battery charging procedure

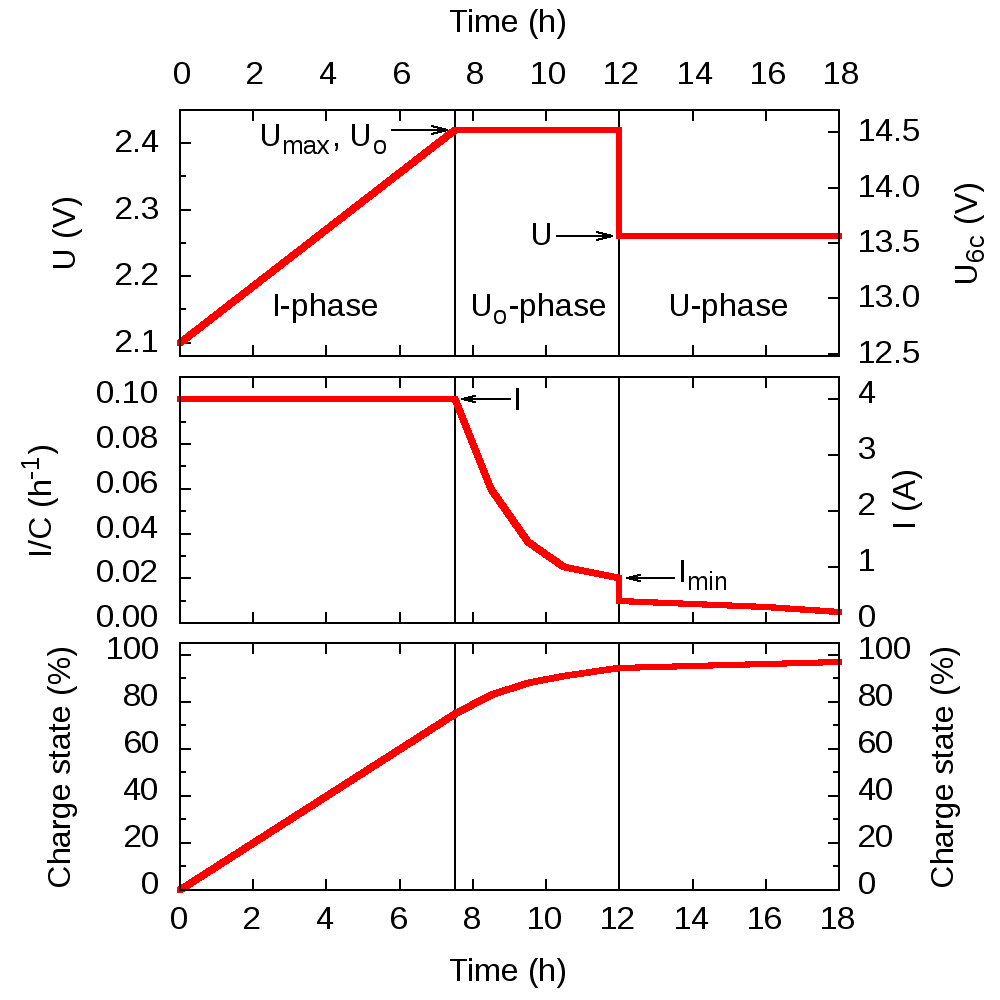
Example charging graph. On the left: per-cell quantities. On the right: example values for a 40 Ah, 6-cell (12 V) battery. Note: schematic illustration; not based on actual measurements.

IUoU battery charging (also called 3-stage, 3-phase, or 3-step charging) is a DIN-designated (DIN 41773) lead–acid battery charging procedure. It consists of three phases (or stages) to be executed by a battery charger: I-phase (constant electric current), U_{O}-phase (constant overvoltage), and U-phase (constant voltage). The purpose is to fully charge the battery in a relatively short time without reducing its life span and to keep the battery charged indefinitely as long as the charger is connected.

== Stages ==
Stage 1 is called the I-phase, constant-current stage, or bulk charge stage. This phase occurs when an IUoU charger is connected to a deeply discharged battery. The charger provides a constant current, typically the maximum current that the charger is capable of producing. As a result of this current, the battery absorbs a charge and its voltage rises. The charger limits the maximum voltage to U_{max}, a constant or temperature-dependent maximum, typically around 2.4 V per cell. Once the U_{max} voltage is reached, typically when the battery is charged to 70–80% of its capacity, the charger enters the Uo-phase. In case of a battery that is more than 80% full, this may happen immediately once the charger is switched on. Some chargers may keep the voltage at U_{max} for some time to allow the current to drop to 20% of the initial current value, before proceeding to the next stage.

Stage 2 is called the U_{o}-phase, constant-voltage boost stage, absorption stage, or topping charge. In this stage, the battery is continued being charged at a constant (over)voltage U_{o}, but the charge current is decreasing. The decrease is imposed by the battery. The voltage in the U_{o}-phase is too high to be applied indefinitely (hence, overvoltage), but it allows charging the battery fully in a relatively short time. The U_{o}-phase is concluded when the charge current goes below a threshold I_{min}, after which the U-phase is entered. This happens when the battery is charged to around 95% of its capacity. Some chargers follow this stage by a second constant-current stage (with a gradually increasing voltage) before continuing with the U-phase. The voltage U_{o} may be the same as U_{max} in the previous stage, or it may be taken slightly higher.

Stage 3 is called the U-phase or float charge state, the voltage is reduced to a value that is safe to be applied for long periods (weeks) without significantly reducing the lifetime of the battery. During this phase, the charge current decreases gradually to a small residual value that compensates for any self-discharge of the battery.

== Voltages and currents ==
The current in the I-phase (stage 1) should be chosen depending on the capacity of the battery. In practice, it depends on the capability of the charger. The battery capacity C is expressed in Ah units, typically the C_{20} value based on a 20-hour discharge time. The charging current (in A units) can be written as C/t where t is a time. For example, for a battery with C = 40 Ah, a current C/10 is equal to 4 A. The charging current is a compromise between charging time (favoring high currents), the prevention of damage due to overheating or outgassing (favoring low currents), and cost of the charger (favoring low currents). Recommendations for the maximum charging current vary between C/10 and C/2. At high charging currents, active cooling measures may be necessary to prevent overheating.

The voltages in the U_{o} and U phases (stages 2 and 3) depend on the type of battery and the temperature. Batteries have varying numbers of cells (typically six for an automotive battery) and may be flooded-cell, absorbed-glass-matt (AGM), or gel-electrolyte types. The numbers in the table below are for a temperature around 20 °C (68 °F). For temperatures that deviate more than about 5 °C (10 °F), a correction should be applied of −5 mV/°C (−2.8 mV/°F) per cell or −0.03 V/°C (−17 mV/°F) for a 12 V (6-cell) battery (higher voltages at lower temperatures and vice versa).

3-stage battery charging voltages and currents at 20 °C (72 °F)
Battery type	Ref.	Stage 1		Stage 2		Stage 3
		U_{max} (V)	I	U_{o} (V)	I_{min}	U (V)
Wet/flooded, single cell		2.32	< C/5	2.42	I/10	2.27
		2.47	< C/2	2.47–2.50	C/100	2.25–2.30
		2.37–2.47	C/10	2.37–2.47	C/33	2.19
Wet/flooded, 6-cell (12 V)		13.9	< C/5	14.5	I/10	13.6
		14.8	< C/2	14.8--15.0	C/100 (Max 24 hours.)	13.5--13.8
AGM, 6-cell (12 V)		13.9	< C/5	14.5	I/10	13.6
		14.1	< C/2	14.1--14.4	C/100	13.6--13.8
Gel electrolyte, 6-cell (12 V)		13.9	< C/5	14.1	I/10	13.6
		14.1	< C/2	14.1--14.4	C/100	13.5--13.8
Deep-cycle antimony, 6-cell (12 V)		14.7	< C/2	14.7--14.9	C/100	13.2--13.4

== Special cases ==
A bad battery will have short I-phase and Uo-phase, but there is a risk of gassing, further damaging the battery.

If a battery is connected to a significant load during charging, the end of the Uo-phase may never be reached and the battery will gas and be damaged, depending on the charge current relative to the battery capacity.
