= Trickle charging =

Charging a battery to keep it fully charged

Trickle charging is the process of charging a fully charged battery at a rate equal to its self-discharge rate, enabling the battery to remain at its fully charged level. This state occurs almost exclusively when the battery is not loaded, as trickle charging will not keep a battery charged if current is being drawn by a load. A battery under continuous float voltage charging is said to be float-charging.

For lead–acid batteries under no-load float charging (such as in SLI batteries), trickle charging happens naturally at the end-of-charge, when the lead–acid battery internal resistance to the charging current increases enough to reduce additional charging current to a trickle, hence the name. In such cases, the trickle charging equals the energy expended by the lead–acid battery splitting the water in the electrolyte into hydrogen and oxygen gases.

Other battery chemistries, such as lithium-ion battery technology, cannot be safely trickle charged. In that case, supervisory circuits (sometimes called battery management systems) adjust electrical conditions during charging to match the requirements of the battery chemistry. For Li-ion batteries generally, and for some variants especially, failure to accommodate the limitations of the chemistry and electro-chemistry of a cell, with regard to trickle charging after reaching a fully charged state, can lead to overheating and fire or explosion.
