= Float voltage =

External voltage needed to keep a battery fully charged

Float voltage is the voltage at which a battery is maintained after being fully charged to maintain that capacity by compensating for self-discharge of the battery. The voltage could be held constant for the entire duration of the cell's operation (such as in an automotive battery) or could be held for a particular phase of charging by the charger. The appropriate float voltage varies significantly with the chemistry and construction of the battery, and ambient temperature.

With the appropriate voltage for the battery type and with proper temperature compensation, a float charger may be kept connected indefinitely without damaging the battery.

However, it should be understood that the concept of a float voltage does not apply equally to all battery chemistries. For instance, lithium ion cells have to be float charged with extra care because if they are float charged at just a little over optimum voltage, which is generally the full output voltage of the lithium cell, the chemical system within the cell will be damaged to some extent.

Some lithium ion variants are less tolerant than others, but generally overheating, which shortens cell life, is likely, and fire and explosion are possible other outcomes. It is important to make certain that the battery cell involved can be safely float charged, and that in the absence of protection from a battery management system, that the charger circuit goes into float charge status when full charge is achieved.

== Lead–acid batteries ==
Accepted average float voltages for lead–acid batteries at 25 °C can be found in the following table:

Lead–acid battery type	single-cell (2 V)	3-cell (6 V)	6-cell (12 V)
Gel battery	2.18	6.53	13.05
Flooded lead–acid cell	2.23	6.7	13.4
Absorbent glass mat	2.27	6.8	13.6

Temperature compensation

Compensation per cell of approximately −3.9 mV/°C (−2.17 mV/°F) of temperature rise is necessary.

Example 1

A 12 V (6-cell) battery at 30 °C (86 °F) (+5 °C change):
(−3.9 mV/°C) × (6 cells) × (5 °C change) = −117 mV
13.4 V (flooded battery float) + (−117 mV) = 13.28 V

Example 2

A 12 V (6-cell) battery at 20 °C (68 °F) (−5 °C change):
(−3.9 mV/°C) × (6 cells) × (−5 °C change) = +117 mV
(13.4 V flooded battery float) + (117 mV) = 13.52 V

Not compensating for temperature will shorten battery life by over- or undercharging.

== See also ==
- Trickle charging – Charging a battery to keep it fully charged
