= Lead–acid battery =

Rechargeable battery type often used in motor vehicles

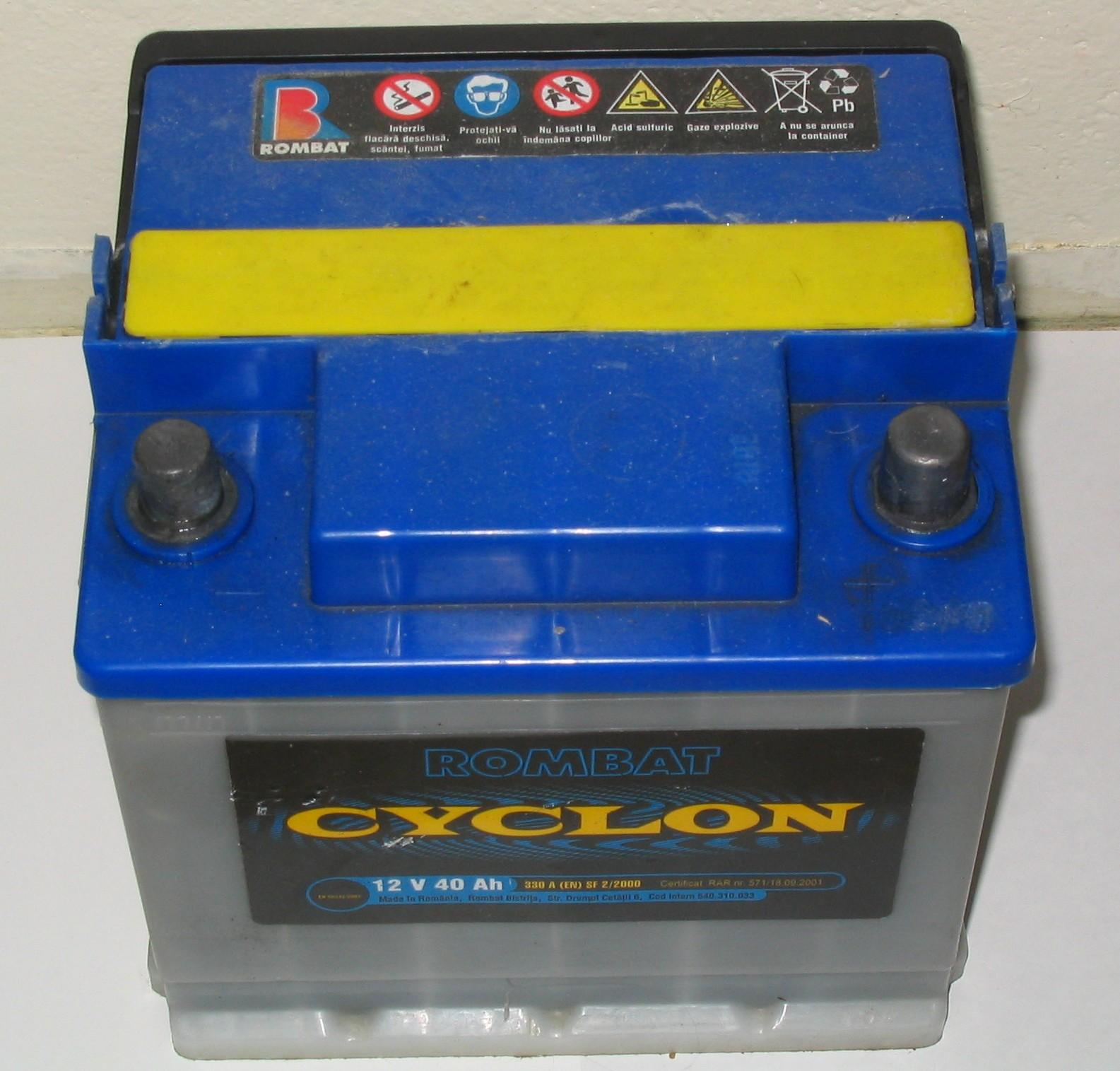
- 12-volt, 40-amp-hour lead–acid automotive battery
- Specific energy: 35–40 Wh/kg
- Energy density: 80–90 Wh/L
- Specific power: 180 W/kg
- Charge/discharge efficiency: 50–95%
- Energy/consumer-price: 7 (sld) to 18 (fld) Wh/US$
- Self-discharge rate: 3%–20%/month
- Cycle durability: <350 cycles
- Nominal cell voltage: 2.1 V
- Charge temperature interval: Min. −35 °C, max. 45 °C

The lead–acid battery is a type of rechargeable battery. First invented in 1859 by French physicist Gaston Planté, it was the first type of rechargeable battery ever created. Compared to the more modern rechargeable batteries, lead–acid batteries have relatively low energy density and heavier weight. Despite this, they are able to supply high surge currents. These features, along with their low cost, make them useful for motor vehicles in order to provide the high current required by starter motors. Lead–acid batteries suffer from relatively short cycle lifespan (usually less than 500 deep cycles) and overall lifespan (due to the double sulfation in the discharged state), as well as long charging times; an average automotive battery takes anywhere between 6 and 12 hours to fully charge from a discharged state.

As they are not as expensive when compared to newer technologies, lead–acid batteries are widely used even when surge current is not important and other designs could provide higher energy densities. In 1999, lead–acid battery sales accounted for 40–50% of the value from batteries sold worldwide (excluding China and Russia), equivalent to a manufacturing market value of about US$15 billion. Large-format lead–acid designs are widely used for storage in backup power supplies in telecommunications networks such as for cell sites, high-availability emergency power systems as used in hospitals, and stand-alone power systems. For these roles, modified versions of the standard cell may be used to improve storage times and reduce maintenance requirements. Gel cell and absorbed glass mat batteries are common in these roles, collectively known as valve-regulated lead–acid (VRLA) batteries.

When charged, the battery's chemical energy is stored in the potential difference between metallic lead at the negative side and lead dioxide on the positive side.

== History ==
The French scientist Nicolas Gautherot observed in 1801 that wires that had been used for electrolysis experiments would themselves provide a small amount of secondary current after the main battery had been disconnected. In 1859, Gaston Planté's lead–acid battery was the first battery that could be recharged by passing a reverse current through it. Planté's first model consisted of two lead sheets separated by rubber strips and rolled into a spiral and immersed in a solution containing about 10 percent sulfuric acid. His batteries were first used to power the lights in train carriages while stopped at a station. In 1881, Camille Alphonse Faure invented an improved version that consisted of a lead grid lattice into which a lead oxide paste was pressed, forming a plate. This design was easier to mass-produce. An early manufacturer (from 1886) of lead–acid batteries was Henri Tudor.

Using a gel electrolyte instead of a liquid allows the battery to be used in different positions without leaking. Gel electrolyte batteries for any position were first used in the late 1920s, and in the 1930s, portable suitcase radio sets allowed the cell to be mounted vertically or horizontally (but not inverted) due to valve design. In the 1970s, the valve-regulated lead–acid (VRLA), or sealed, battery was developed, including modern absorbed glass mat (AGM) types, allowing operation in any position.

It was discovered early in 2011 that lead–acid batteries do in fact use some aspects of relativity to function, and to a lesser degree, liquid metal and molten-salt batteries such as the Ca-Sb and Sn-Bi also use this effect.

== Electrochemistry ==
=== Discharge ===
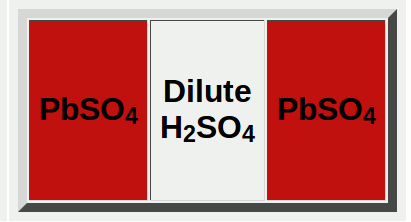
Fully discharged: two identical lead sulfate plates and diluted sulfuric acid solution

In the discharged state, both the positive and negative plates become lead(II) sulfate (PbSO_{4}), and the electrolyte loses much of its dissolved sulfuric acid and becomes primarily water.

Negative plate reaction
Pb(s) + HSO^{−}_{4}(aq) → PbSO_{4}(s) + H^{+}(aq) + 2e^{−}

The release of two conduction electrons gives the lead electrode a negative charge.

As electrons accumulate, they create an electric field that attracts hydrogen ions and repels sulfate ions, leading to a double layer near the surface. The hydrogen ions screen the charged electrode from the solution, which limits further reaction unless charge is allowed to flow out of the electrode.

Positive plate reaction
PbO_{2}(s) + HSO^{−}_{4}(aq) + 3H^{+}(aq) + 2e^{−} → PbSO_{4}(s) + 2H_{2}O(l)

taking advantage of the metallic conductivity of PbO_{2}.

The total reaction can be written as

Pb(s) + PbO_{2}(s) + 2H_{2}SO_{4}(aq) → 2PbSO_{4}(s) + 2H_{2}O(l) $E_{cell}^\circ = 2.05\text{ V}$

The net energy released per mole (207 g) of Pb(s) converted to PbSO_{4}(s) is approximately 400 kJ, corresponding to the formation of 36 g of water. The sum of the molecular masses of the reactants is 642.6 g/mole, so theoretically a cell can produce two faradays of charge (192,971 coulombs) from 642.6 g of reactants, or 83.4 ampere-hours per kilogram for a 2-volt cell (or 13.9 ampere-hours per kilogram for a 12-volt battery). This comes to 167 watt-hours per kilogram of reactants, but in practice, a lead–acid cell gives only 30–40 watt-hours per kilogram of battery, due to the mass of the water and other constituent part.

==== Another form for discharging reaction ====
Negative plate
Pb(s) + H_{2}SO_{4}(aq) → PbSO_{4}(s) + 2H^{+}(aq) + 2e^{-}
Positive plate
PbO_{2}(s) + H_{2}SO_{4}(aq) + 2H^{+}(aq) + 2e^{-} → PbSO_{4}(s) + 2H_{2}O(l)

=== Charging ===
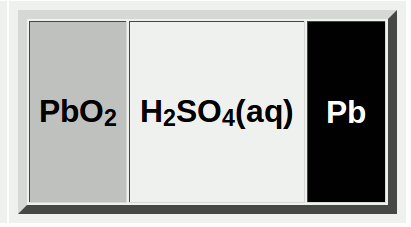
Fully charged: Lead dioxide positive plate, lead negative plate, and concentrated aqueous sulfuric acid solution.

In the fully charged state, the negative plate consists of lead and the positive plate is lead dioxide. The electrolyte solution has a higher concentration of aqueous sulfuric acid, which stores most of the chemical energy.

Overcharging with high charging voltages generates oxygen and hydrogen gas by electrolysis of water, which bubbles out and is lost. The design of some types of lead–acid battery (e.g., "flooded", but not VRLA (AGM or gel)) allows the electrolyte level to be inspected and topped up with pure water to replace any that has been lost in this way.

=== Effect of charge level on freezing point ===
Because of freezing-point depression, the electrolyte is more likely to freeze in a cold environment when the battery has a low charge and a correspondingly low sulfuric acid concentration.

=== Ion motion ===
During discharge, H^{+} produced at the negative plates moves into the electrolyte solution and is then consumed at the positive plates, while HSO^{−}_{4} is consumed at both plates. The reverse occurs during the charge. This motion can be electrically-driven proton flow (the Grotthuss mechanism), or by diffusion through the medium, or by the flow of a liquid electrolyte medium. Since the electrolyte density is greater when the sulfuric acid concentration is higher, the liquid will tend to circulate by convection. Therefore, a liquid-medium cell tends to rapidly discharge and rapidly charge more efficiently than an otherwise-similar gel cell.

== Measuring the charge level ==
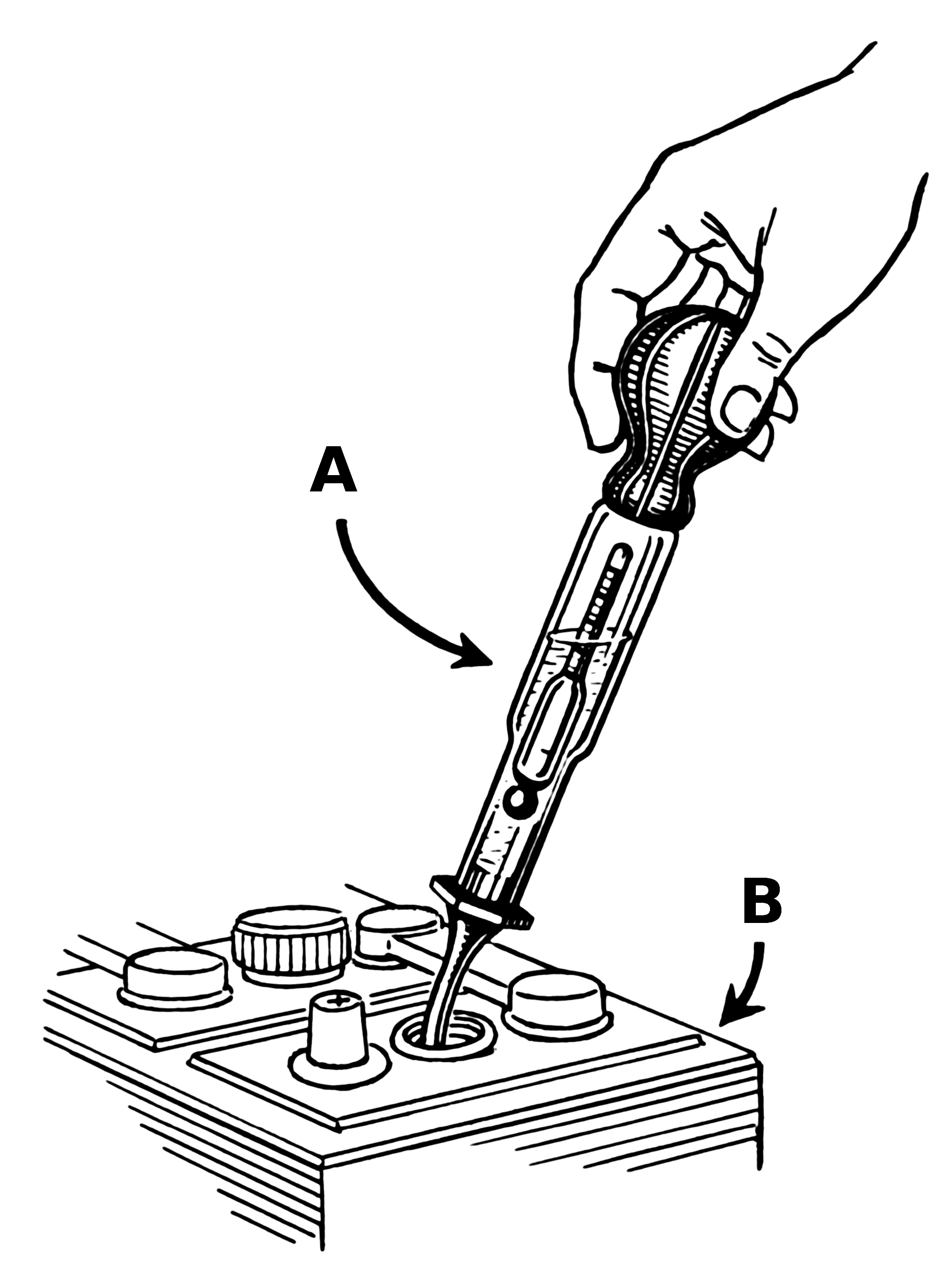
A hydrometer can be used to test the specific gravity of each cell as a measure of its state of charge.

Because the electrolyte takes part in the charge-discharge reaction, this battery has one major advantage over other chemistries: it is relatively simple to determine the state of charge by merely measuring the specific gravity of the electrolyte; the specific gravity falls as the battery discharges. Some battery designs include a simple hydrometer using colored floating balls of differing density. When used in diesel-electric submarines, the specific gravity was regularly measured and written on a blackboard in the control room to indicate how much longer the boat could remain submerged.

The battery's open-circuit voltage can also be used to gauge the state of charge. If the connections to the individual cells are accessible, then the state of charge of each cell can be determined which can provide a guide as to the state of health of the battery as a whole; otherwise, the overall battery voltage may be assessed.

== Voltages for common usage ==
IUoU battery charging is a three-stage charging procedure for lead–acid batteries. A lead–acid battery's nominal voltage is 2.1 V for each cell. For a single cell, the voltage can range from 1.8 V loaded at full discharge, to 2.10 V in an open circuit at full charge.

Float voltage varies depending on battery type (flooded cells, gelled electrolyte, absorbed glass mat), and ranges from 1.8 V to 2.27 V. Equalization voltage, and charging voltage for sulfated cells, can range from 2.67 V to almost 3 V (only until a charge current is flowing). Specific values for a given battery depend on the design and manufacturer recommendations, and are usually given at a baseline temperature of 20 °C (68 °F), requiring adjustment for ambient conditions. IEEE Standard 485-2020 (first published in 1997) is the industry's recommended practice for sizing lead–acid batteries in stationary applications.

== Construction ==
=== Plates ===
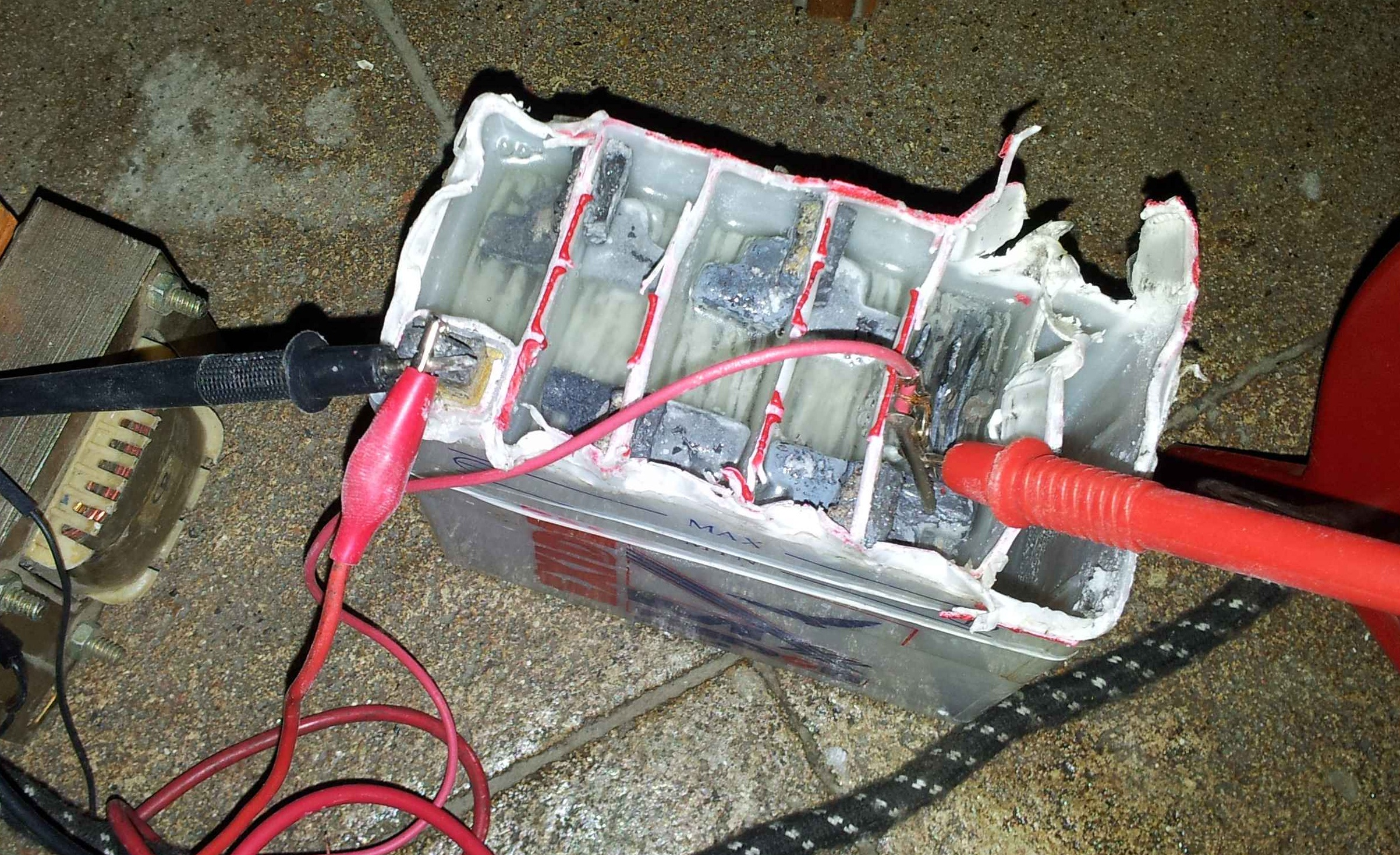
Internal view of a small lead–acid battery from an electric-start–equipped motorcycle

The lead–acid cell can be demonstrated using sheet lead plates for the two electrodes. However, such a construction produces only around one ampere for roughly postcard-sized plates, and for only a few minutes.

Gaston Planté found a way to provide a much larger effective surface area. In Planté's design, the positive and negative plates were formed of two spirals of lead foil, separated with a sheet of cloth and coiled up. The cells initially had low capacity, so a slow process of forming was required to corrode the lead foils, creating lead dioxide on the plates and roughening them to increase surface area. Initially, this process used electricity from primary batteries; when generators became available after 1870, the cost of producing batteries greatly declined. Planté plates are still used in some stationary applications, where the plates are mechanically grooved to increase their surface area.

In 1880, Camille Alphonse Faure patented a method of coating a lead grid (which serves as the current conductor) with a paste of lead oxides, sulfuric acid, and water, followed by curing phase in which the plates were exposed to gentle heat in a high-humidity environment. The curing process changed the paste into a mixture of lead sulfates which adhered to the lead plate. Then, during the battery's initial charge (called formation), the cured paste on the plates was converted into electrochemically active material (the active mass). Faure's process significantly reduced the time and cost to manufacture lead–acid batteries, and gave a substantial increase in capacity compared with Planté's battery. Faure's method is still in use today, with only incremental improvements to paste composition, curing (which is still done with steam, but is now a very tightly controlled process), and structure and composition of the grid to which the paste is applied.

The grid developed by Faure was of pure lead with connecting rods of lead at right angles. In contrast, present-day grids are structured for improved mechanical strength and improved current flow. In addition to different grid patterns (ideally, all points on the plate are equidistant from the power conductor), modern-day processes also apply one or two thin fiberglass mats over the grid to distribute the weight more evenly. And while Faure had used pure lead for his grids, within a year (1881) these had been superseded by lead–antimony (8–12%) alloys to give the structures additional rigidity. However, high-antimony grids have higher hydrogen evolution (which also accelerates as the battery ages), and thus greater outgassing and higher maintenance costs. These issues were identified by U. B. Thomas and W. E. Haring at Bell Labs in the 1930s and eventually led to the development of lead–calcium grid alloys in 1935 for standby power batteries on the U.S. telephone network. Related research led to the development of lead–selenium grid alloys in Europe a few years later. Both lead–calcium and lead–selenium grid alloys still add antimony, albeit in much smaller quantities than the older high-antimony grids: lead–calcium grids have 4–6% antimony while lead–selenium grids have 1–2%. These metallurgical improvements give the grid more strength, which allows it to carry more weight, and therefore more active material, and so the plates can be thicker, which in turn contributes to battery lifespan since there is more material available to shed before the battery becomes unusable. High-antimony alloy grids are still used in batteries intended for frequent cycling, e.g. in motor-starting applications where frequent expansion/contraction of the plates need to be compensated for, but where outgassing is not significant since charge currents remain low. Since the 1950s, batteries designed for infrequent cycling applications (e.g., standby power batteries) increasingly have lead–calcium or lead–selenium alloy grids since these have less hydrogen evolution and thus lower maintenance overhead. Lead–calcium alloy grids are cheaper to manufacture (the cells thus have lower up-front costs), and have a lower self-discharge rate, and lower watering requirements, but have slightly poorer conductivity, are mechanically weaker (and thus require more antimony to compensate), and are more strongly subject to corrosion (and thus a shorter lifespan) than cells with lead–selenium alloy grids.

The open-circuit effect is a dramatic loss of battery cycle life, which was observed when calcium was substituted for antimony. It is also known as the antimony free effect.

=== Modern approach ===
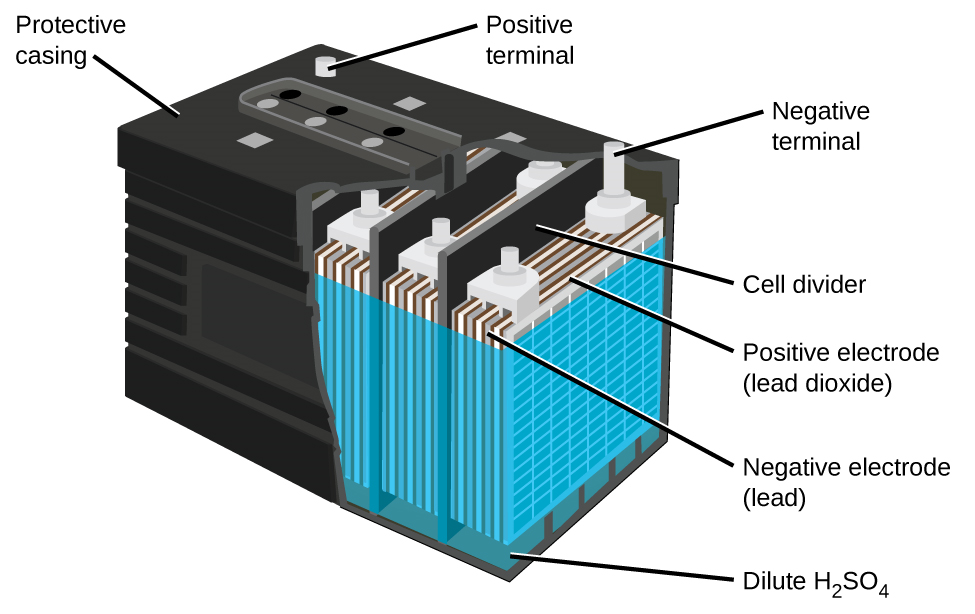
Structure of a lead–acid battery

Modern-day paste contains carbon black, blanc fixe (barium sulfate), and lignosulfonate. The blanc fixe acts as a seed crystal for the lead–to–lead-sulfate reaction. The blanc fixe must be fully dispersed in the paste in order for it to be effective. The lignosulfonate prevents the negative plate from forming a solid mass during the discharge cycle, instead enabling the formation of long needle–like dendrites. The long crystals have more surface area and are easily converted back to the original state on charging. Carbon black counteracts the effect of inhibiting formation caused by the lignosulfonates. Sulfonated naphthalene condensate dispersant is a more effective expander than lignosulfonate and speeds up formation. This dispersant improves the dispersion of barium sulfate in the paste, reduces hydroset time, produces a more breakage-resistant plate, reduces fine lead particles, and thereby improves handling and pasting characteristics. It extends battery life by increasing end-of-charge voltage. Sulfonated naphthalene requires about one-third to one-half the amount of lignosulfonate and is stable to higher temperatures.

Once dry, the plates are stacked with suitable separators and inserted in a cell container. The alternate plates then constitute alternating positive and negative electrodes, and within the cell are later connected to one another (negative to negative, positive to positive) in parallel. The separators inhibit the plates from touching each other, which would otherwise constitute a short circuit. In flooded and gel cells, the separators are insulating rails or studs, formerly of glass or ceramic, and now of plastic. In AGM cells, the separator is the glass mat itself, and the rack of plates with separators are squeezed together before insertion into the cell; once in the cell, the glass mats expand slightly, effectively locking the plates in place. In multi-cell batteries, the cells are then connected to one another in series, either through connectors through the cell walls, or by a bridge over the cell walls. All intra-cell and inter-cell connections are of the same lead alloy as that used in the grids. This is necessary to prevent galvanic corrosion.

Deep-cycle batteries have a different geometry for their positive electrodes. The positive electrode is not a flat plate but a row of lead–oxide cylinders or tubes strung side by side, so their geometry is called tubular or cylindrical. The advantage of this is an increased surface area in contact with the electrolyte, with higher discharge and charge currents than a flat-plate cell of the same volume and depth-of-charge. Tubular-electrode cells have a higher power density than flat-plate cells. This makes cylindrical-geometry plates especially suitable for high-current applications with weight or space limitations, such as for forklifts or for starting marine diesel engines. However, because cylinders have less active material in the same volume, they also have lower energy densities than otherwise comparable flat-plate cells, and less active material at the electrode also means they have less material available to shed before the cells become unusable. Cylindrical electrodes are also more complicated to manufacture uniformly, which tends to make them more expensive than flat-plate cells. These trade-offs limit the range of applications in which cylindrical batteries are meaningful to situations where there is insufficient space to install higher-capacity (and thus larger) flat-plate units.

About 60% of the weight of an automotive-type lead–acid battery rated around 60 A·h is lead or internal parts made of lead; the balance is electrolyte, separators, and the case. For example, there are approximately 8.7 kilograms (19 lb) of lead in a typical 14.5-kilogram (32 lb) battery.

=== Separators ===
Separators between the positive and negative plates prevent short circuits through physical contact, mostly through dendrites (treeing), but also through shedding of the active material. Separators allow the flow of ions between the plates of an electrochemical cell to form a closed circuit. Glass fiber mat, rubber, and PVC or polyethylene plastic have been used to make separators.

An effective separator must possess a number of mechanical properties, including permeability, porosity, pore size distribution, specific surface area, mechanical design and strength, electrical resistance, ionic conductivity, and chemical compatibility with the electrolyte. In service, the separator must have good resistance to acid and oxidation. The area of the separator must be a little larger than the area of the plates to prevent material shorting between the plates. The separators must remain stable over the battery's operating temperature range.

=== Absorbent glass mat ===
Opened AGM battery

In the absorbent glass mat (AGM) design, the separators between the plates are replaced by a glass fibre mat soaked in electrolyte. There is only enough electrolyte in the mat to keep it wet, and if the battery is punctured, the electrolyte will not flow out of the mats. The principal purpose of replacing liquid electrolyte in a flooded battery with a semi-saturated fiberglass mat is to substantially increase the gas transport through the separator; hydrogen or oxygen gas produced during overcharge or charge (if the charge current is excessive) is able to freely pass through the glass mat and reduce or oxidize the opposing plate, respectively. In a flooded cell, the bubbles of gas float to the top of the battery and are lost to the atmosphere. This mechanism for the gas produced to recombine and the additional benefit of a semi-saturated cell providing no substantial leakage of electrolyte upon physical puncture of the battery case allows the battery to be completely sealed, which makes them useful in portable devices and similar roles. Additionally, the battery can be installed in any orientation, though if it is installed upside down, then acid may be blown out through the overpressure vent.

To reduce the water loss rate, calcium is alloyed with the plates; however, gas build-up remains a problem when the battery is deeply or rapidly charged or discharged. To prevent over-pressurization of the battery casing, AGM batteries include a one-way blow-off valve, and are often known as valve-regulated lead–acid (VRLA) designs.

Another advantage to the AGM design is that the electrolyte becomes the separator material and is mechanically strong. This allows the plate stack to be compressed together in the battery shell, slightly increasing energy density compared to liquid or gel versions. AGM batteries often show a characteristic bulging in their shells when built in common rectangular shapes, due to the expansion of the positive plates.

The mat also prevents the vertical motion of the electrolyte within the battery. When a normal wet cell is stored in a discharged state, the heavier acid molecules tend to settle to the bottom of the battery, causing the electrolyte to stratify. When the battery is then used, the majority of the current flows only in this area, and the bottom of the plates tends to wear out rapidly. This is one of the reasons a conventional car battery can be ruined by leaving it stored for a long period and then used and recharged. The mat significantly prevents this stratification, eliminating the need to periodically shake the batteries, boil them, or run an equalization charge through them to mix the electrolyte. Stratification also causes the upper layers of the battery to become almost completely water, which can freeze in cold weather; AGMs are significantly less susceptible to damage due to low-temperature use.

While AGM cells do not permit watering (typically it is impossible to add water without drilling a hole in the battery), their recombination process is fundamentally limited by the usual chemical processes. Hydrogen gas will even diffuse right through the plastic case itself. Some have found that it is profitable to add water to an AGM battery, but this must be done slowly to allow for the water to mix throughout the battery via diffusion. When a lead–acid battery loses water, its acid concentration increases, increasing the corrosion rate of the plates significantly. AGM cells already have a high acid content in an attempt to lower the water loss rate and increase standby voltage, and this brings about shorter life compared to a lead–antimony flooded battery. If the open circuit voltage of AGM cells is significantly higher than 2.093 volts, or 12.56 V for a 12 V battery, then it has a higher acid content than a flooded cell; while this is normal for an AGM battery, it is not desirable for long life.

AGM cells that are intentionally or accidentally overcharged will show a higher open-circuit voltage according to the water lost (and acid concentration increased). One amp-hour of overcharge will electrolyse 0.335 grams of water per cell; some of this liberated hydrogen and oxygen will recombine, but not all of it.

=== Gelled electrolytes ===
During the 1970s, researchers developed the sealed version or gel battery, which mixes a silica gelling agent into the electrolyte (silica-gel-based lead–acid batteries used in portable radios from the early 1930s were not fully sealed). This converts the formerly liquid interior of the cells into a semi-stiff paste, providing many of the same advantages of the AGM. Such designs are even less susceptible to evaporation and are often used in situations where little or no periodic maintenance is possible. Gel cells also have lower freezing and higher boiling points than the liquid electrolytes used in conventional wet cells and AGMs, which makes them suitable for use in extreme conditions.

The only downside to the gel design is that the gel prevents rapid motion of the ions in the electrolyte, which reduces carrier mobility and thus surge current capability. For this reason, gel cells are most commonly found in energy storage applications like off-grid systems.

=== Valve-regulated lead–acid (VRLA) batteries ===
A selection of sealed VRLA batteries

In a valve-regulated lead–acid (VRLA) battery, the hydrogen and oxygen produced in the cells largely recombine into water. Leakage is minimal, although some electrolyte still escapes if the recombination cannot keep up with gas evolution. Since VRLA batteries do not require (and make impossible) regular checking of the electrolyte level, they have been called maintenance-free batteries. However, this is somewhat of a misnomer: VRLA cells do require maintenance. As electrolyte is lost, VRLA cells dry out and lose capacity. This can be detected by taking regular internal resistance, conductance, or impedance measurements. Regular testing reveals whether more involved testing and maintenance is required. Maintenance procedures have recently been developed allowing rehydration, often restoring significant amounts of lost capacity.

VRLA types became popular on motorcycles around 1983, because the separator improves resistance to vibration and prevents the acid electrolyte from spilling. They are also popular in stationary applications such as telecommunications sites, due to their small footprint and installation flexibility.

Both gel and AGM designs are sealed, do not require watering, can be used in any orientation, and use a valve for gas blowoff. For this reason, both designs can be called maintenance-free, sealed, and VRLA. However, it is quite common to find resources stating that these terms refer to one or another of these designs, specifically.

== Applications ==
Most of the world's lead–acid batteries are automobile starting, lighting, and ignition (SLI) batteries, with an estimated 320 million units shipped in 1999. In 1992 about 3 million tons of lead were used in the manufacture of batteries. More recent data shows continued growth, with approximately 150 million units shipped in 2024 across North America.

Wet cell stand-by (stationary) batteries designed for deep discharge are commonly used in large backup power supplies for telephone and computer centres, grid energy storage, and off-grid household electric power systems. Lead–acid batteries are used in emergency lighting and to power sump pumps in case of power failure.

Traction (propulsion) batteries are used in golf carts and other battery electric vehicles. Large lead–acid batteries are also used to power the electric motors in diesel–electric (conventional) submarines when submerged, and are used as emergency power on nuclear submarines as well. Valve-regulated lead–acid batteries cannot spill their electrolyte. They are used in back-up power supplies for alarm and smaller computer systems (particularly in uninterruptible power supplies) and for e-scooters, electric wheelchairs, electrified bicycles, marine applications, battery electric vehicles or micro hybrid vehicles, and motorcycles. Many electric forklifts use lead–acid batteries, where the weight is used as part of a counterweight. Lead–acid batteries were used to supply the filament (heater) voltage, with 2 V common in early vacuum tube (valve) radio receivers.

Portable batteries for miners' cap headlamps typically used to have two or three cells.

== Cycles ==
=== Starting batteries ===
Opened automobile battery pack in a Škoda Fabia

Lead–acid batteries designed for starting automotive engines are not designed for deep discharge. They have a large number of thin plates designed for maximum surface area, and therefore maximum current output, which can easily be damaged by deep discharge. Repeated deep discharges will result in capacity loss and ultimately in premature failure, either as the plates disintegrate due to mechanical stresses or from rapid sulfation when the plates are at low voltages during the deep-cycle.

Starting batteries kept on a continuous float charge might suffer from grid corrosion which can result in failure modes. Starter batteries can therefore be kept open circuit but charged regularly (e.g. once a month) to prevent sulfation.

Starting batteries are lighter than deep-cycle batteries of the same size, because the thinner and lighter cell plates do not extend all the way to the bottom of the battery case. This allows loose, disintegrated material to fall off the plates and collect at the bottom of the cell, prolonging the service life of the battery. If this loose debris rises enough, then it may touch the bottom of the plates and cause failure of a cell, resulting in loss of battery voltage and capacity.

=== Deep-cycle batteries ===
Specially designed deep-cycle cells are much less susceptible to degradation due to cycling, and are required for applications where the batteries are regularly discharged, such as photovoltaic systems, electric vehicles (forklift, golf cart, electric cars, and others), and uninterruptible power supplies. These batteries have thicker plates that cannot deliver as much peak current but can withstand frequent discharging.

Some batteries are designed as a compromise between starter (high-current) and deep cycle. They are able to be discharged to a greater degree than automotive batteries, but less so than deep-cycle batteries. They may be referred to as marine, motorhome, or leisure batteries.

=== Fast and slow charge and discharge ===
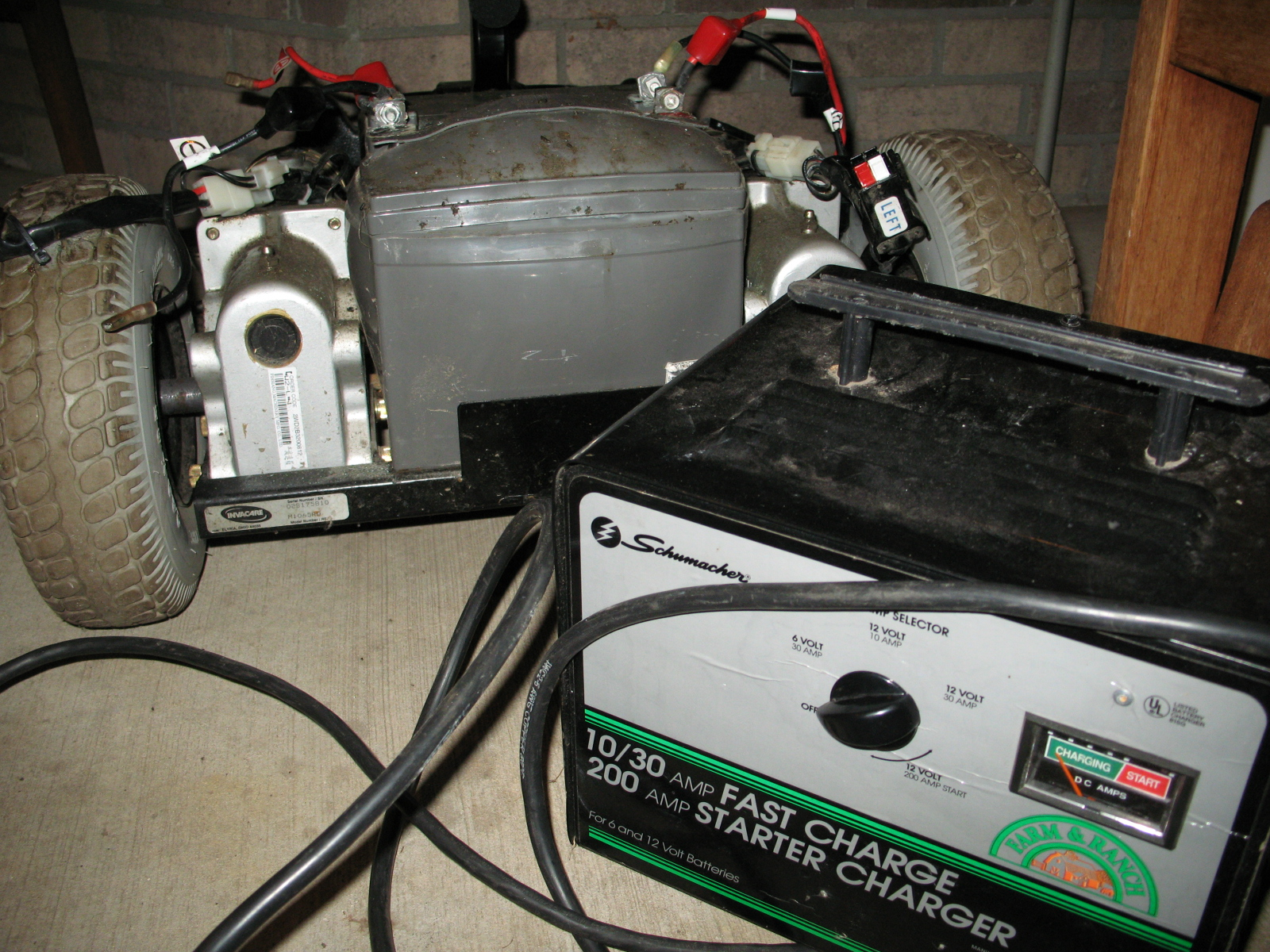
Charge current needs to match the ability of the battery to absorb the energy. Using too great a charge current on a small battery can lead to boiling and venting of the electrolyte. In this image a VRLA battery case has ballooned due to the high gas pressure developed during overcharge.

The capacity of a lead–acid battery is not a fixed quantity but varies according to how quickly it is discharged. The empirical relationship between discharge rate and capacity is known as Peukert's law.

When a battery is charged or discharged, only the reacting chemicals, which are at the interface between the electrodes and the electrolyte, are initially affected. With time, the charge stored in the chemicals at the interface, often called interface charge or surface charge, spreads by diffusion of these chemicals throughout the volume of the active material.

Consider a battery that has been completely discharged (such as occurs when leaving the car lights on overnight, a current draw of about 6 amps). If it then is given a fast charge for only a few minutes, the battery plates charge only near the interface between the plates and the electrolyte. In this case the battery voltage might rise to a value near that of the charger voltage; this causes the charging current to decrease significantly. After a few hours this interface charge will spread to the volume of the electrode and electrolyte; this leads to an interface charge so low that it may be insufficient to start the car. As long as the charging voltage stays below the gassing voltage (about 14.4 volts in a normal lead–acid battery), battery damage is unlikely, and in time the battery should return to a nominally charged state.

== Sulfation and desulfation ==
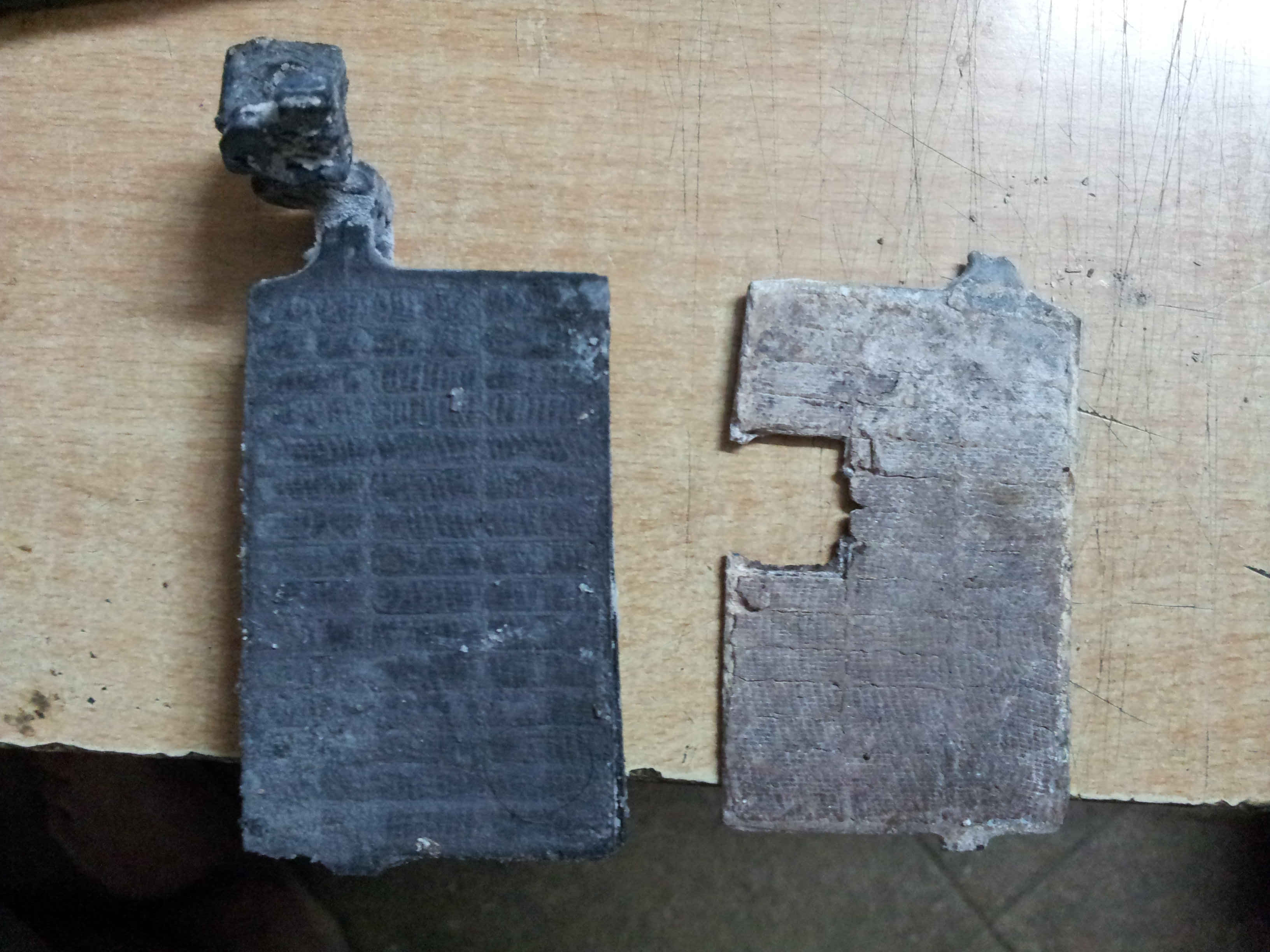
Sulfated plates from a 12-V 5-Ah battery

Lead–acid batteries lose the ability to accept a charge when discharged for too long due to sulfation, the crystallization of lead sulfate. They generate electricity through a double sulfate chemical reaction. Lead and lead dioxide, the active materials on the battery's plates, react with sulfuric acid in the electrolyte to form lead sulfate. The lead sulfate first forms in a finely divided, amorphous state and easily reverts to lead, lead dioxide, and sulfuric acid when the battery recharges. As batteries cycle through numerous discharges and charges, some lead sulfate does not recombine into electrolyte and slowly converts into a stable crystalline form that no longer dissolves on recharging. Thus, not all the lead is returned to the battery plates, and the amount of usable active material necessary for electricity generation declines over time.

Sulfation occurs in lead–acid batteries when they are subjected to insufficient charging during normal operation, it also occurs when lead–acid batteries left unused with incomplete charge for an extended time. It impedes recharging; sulfate deposits ultimately expand, cracking the plates and destroying the battery. Eventually, so much of the battery plate area is unable to supply current that the battery capacity is greatly reduced. In addition, the sulfate portion (of the lead sulfate) is not returned to the electrolyte as sulfuric acid. It is believed that large crystals physically block the electrolyte from entering the pores of the plates. A white coating on the plates may be visible in batteries with clear cases or after dismantling the battery. Batteries that are sulfated show a high internal resistance and can deliver only a small fraction of normal discharge current. Sulfation also affects the charging cycle, resulting in longer charging times, less-efficient and incomplete charging, and higher battery temperatures.

SLI batteries (starting, lighting, ignition; e.g., car batteries) suffer the most deterioration because vehicles normally stand unused for relatively long periods of time. Deep-cycle and motive power batteries are subjected to regular controlled overcharging, eventually failing due to corrosion of the positive plate grids rather than sulfation.

Sulfation can be avoided if the battery is fully recharged immediately after a discharge cycle. There are no known independently verified ways to reverse sulfation. There are commercial products claiming to achieve desulfation through various techniques such as pulse charging, but there are no peer-reviewed publications verifying their claims. Sulfation prevention remains the best course of action, by periodically fully charging the lead–acid batteries.

== Stratification ==
A typical lead–acid battery contains a mixture with varying concentrations of water and acid. Sulfuric acid has a higher density than water, which causes the acid formed at the plates during charging to flow downward and collect at the bottom of the battery. Eventually the mixture will again reach uniform composition by diffusion, but this is a very slow process. Repeated cycles of partial charging and discharging will increase stratification of the electrolyte, reducing the capacity and performance of the battery because the lack of acid on top limits plate activation. The stratification also promotes corrosion on the upper half of the plates and sulfation at the bottom.

Periodic overcharging creates gaseous reaction products at the plate, causing convection currents which mix the electrolyte and resolve the stratification. Mechanical stirring of the electrolyte would have the same effect. Batteries in moving vehicles are also subject to sloshing and splashing in the cells, as the vehicle accelerates, brakes, and turns.

== Safety ==
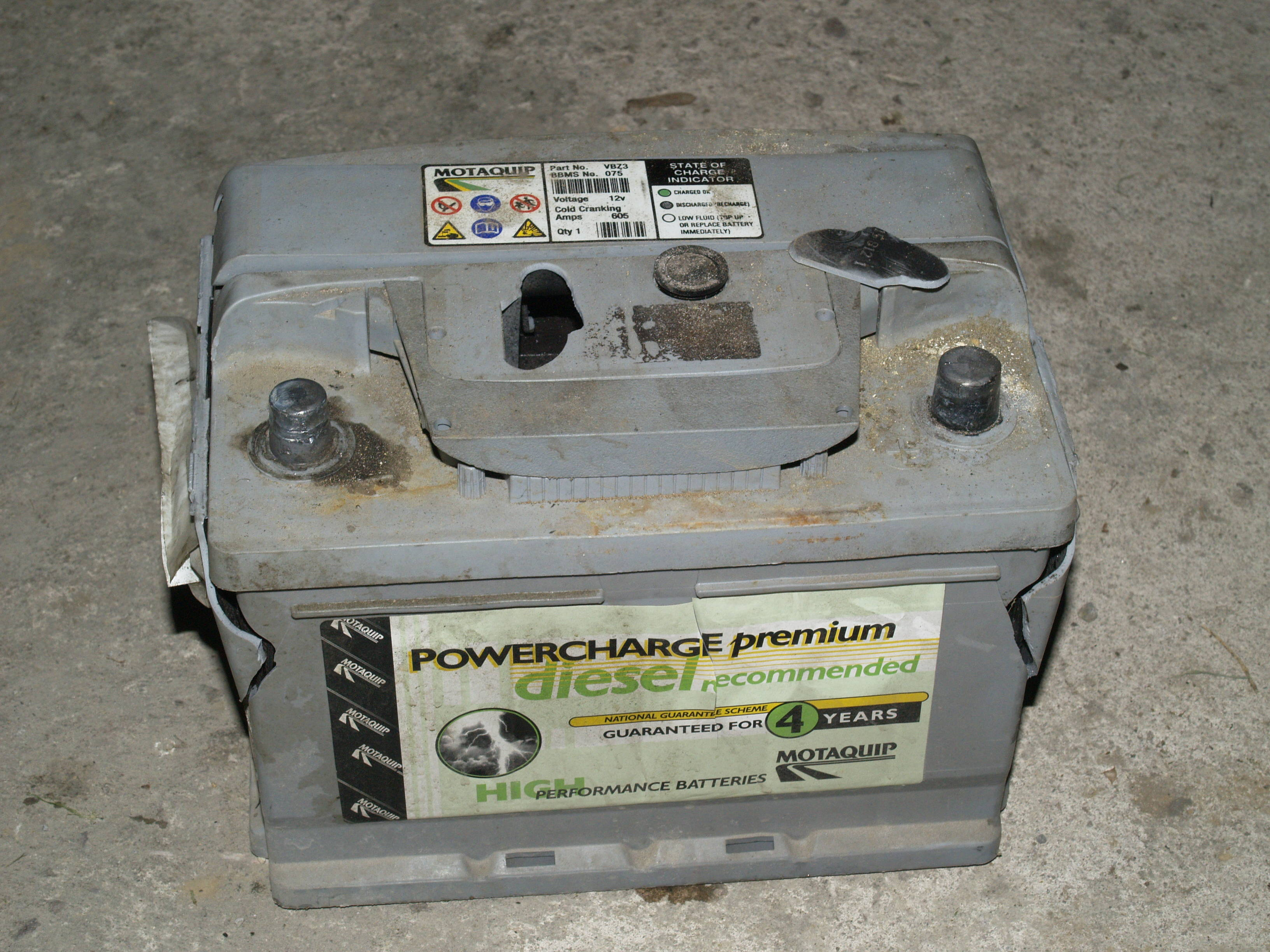
Car lead–acid battery after explosion showing brittle fracture in casing ends

Excessive charging causes electrolysis, emitting hydrogen and oxygen in a process known as gassing. Wet cells have open vents to release any gas produced, and VRLA batteries rely on valves fitted to each cell. Catalytic caps are available for flooded cells to recombine hydrogen and oxygen. A VRLA cell normally recombines any hydrogen and oxygen produced inside the cell, but malfunction or overheating may cause gas to build up. If this happens (for example, on overcharging), then the valve vents the gas and normalizes the pressure, producing a characteristic acidic smell. However, valves can fail, such as if dirt and debris accumulate, allowing pressure to build up.

Accumulated hydrogen and oxygen sometimes ignite in an internal explosion. The force of the explosion can cause the battery's casing to burst, or cause its top to fly off, spraying acid and casing fragments. An explosion in one cell may ignite any combustible gas mixture in the remaining cells. Similarly, in a poorly ventilated area, connecting or disconnecting a closed circuit (such as a load or a charger) to the battery terminals can also cause sparks and an explosion, if any gas was vented from the cells.

Individual cells within a battery can also short circuit, causing an explosion.

The cells of VRLA batteries typically swell when the internal pressure rises, thereby giving a warning to users and mechanics. The deformation varies from cell to cell, and is greatest at the ends where the walls are unsupported by other cells. Such over-pressurized batteries should be carefully isolated and discarded. Personnel working near batteries at risk of explosion should protect their eyes and exposed skin from burns due to spraying acid and fire by wearing a face shield, overalls, and gloves. Using goggles instead of a face shield leaves the face exposed to possible flying acid, case or battery fragments, and heat from a potential explosion.

== Environment ==
=== Environmental concerns ===
According to a 2003 report entitled "Getting the Lead Out", by Environmental Defense and the Ecology Center of Ann Arbor, Michigan, the batteries of vehicles on the road contained an estimated 2,600,000 metric tons (2,600,000 long tons; 2,900,000 short tons) of lead. Some lead compounds are extremely toxic. Long-term exposure to even tiny amounts of these compounds can cause brain and kidney damage, hearing impairment, and learning problems in children. The auto industry uses over 1,000,000 metric tons (980,000 long tons; 1,100,000 short tons) of lead every year, with 90% going to conventional lead–acid vehicle batteries. While lead recycling is a well-established industry, more than 40,000 metric tons (39,000 long tons; 44,000 short tons) ends up in landfills every year. According to the federal Toxic Release Inventory, another 70,000 metric tons (69,000 long tons; 77,000 short tons) are released in the lead mining and manufacturing process.

Attempts are being made to develop alternatives (particularly for automotive use) because of concerns about the environmental consequences of improper disposal and of lead smelting operations, among other reasons. Alternatives are unlikely to displace them for applications such as engine starting or backup power systems, since the batteries, although heavy, are inexpensive in up-front cost.

=== Recycling ===
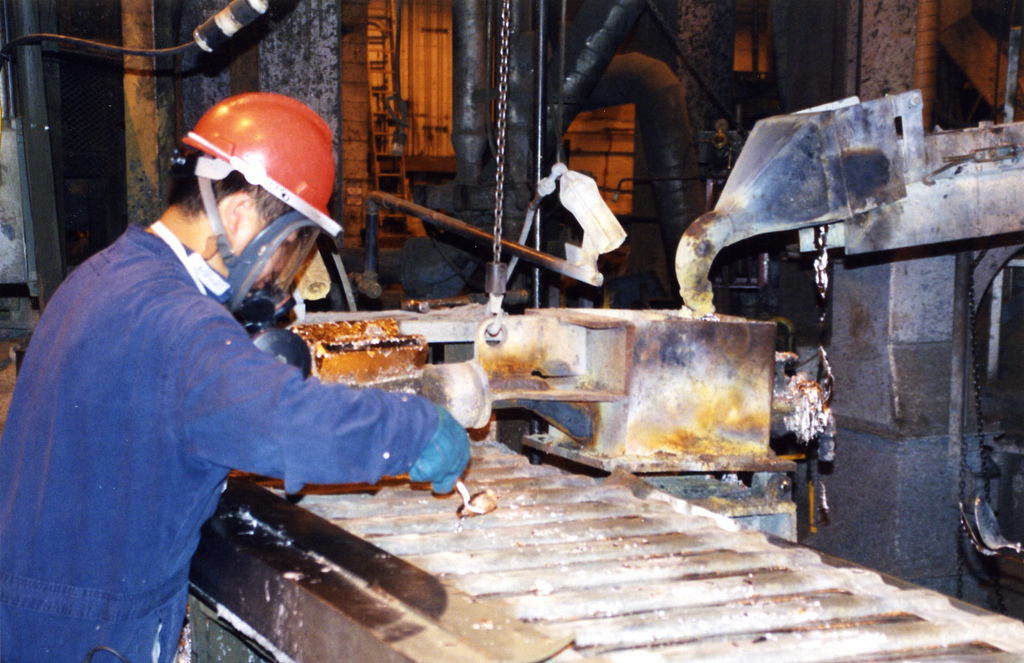
A worker recycling molten lead in a battery recycling facility

According to the Battery Council International, an industry group, lead–acid battery recycling is one of the most successful recycling programs in the world. In the United States 99% of all battery lead was recycled between 2017 and 2021. Data from the U.S. Environmental Protection Administration, confirm that the recycling rate has risen from 76% in 1970, to 99% in modern times.

Lead is highly toxic to humans, and recycling it can result in pollution and contamination of people, resulting in numerous and lasting health problems. One ranking identifies lead–acid battery recycling as the world's most deadly industrial process, in terms of disability-adjusted life years lost—resulting in 2,000,000 to 4,800,000 estimated years of individual human life lost, globally.

Lead–acid battery-recycling sites have themselves become a source of lead pollution, and by 1992, the EPA had selected 29 such sites for its Superfund clean-up, with 22 on its National Priority List.

An effective pollution control system is a necessity to prevent lead emission. Continuous improvement in battery recycling plants and furnace designs is required to keep pace with emission standards for lead smelters. Voluntary certification programs such as LeadBattery360 aim to drive such improvements.

== Additives ==
Chemical additives have been used ever since the lead–acid battery became a commercial item, to reduce lead sulfate buildup on plates and improve battery condition when added to the electrolyte of a vented lead–acid battery. Such treatments are rarely, if ever, effective.

Two compounds used for such purposes are Epsom salts and EDTA. Epsom salts reduce the internal resistance in a weak or damaged battery and may allow a small amount of extended life. EDTA can be used to dissolve the sulfate deposits of heavily discharged plates. However, the dissolved material is then no longer available to participate in the normal charge-discharge cycle, so a battery temporarily revived with EDTA will have a reduced life expectancy. Residual EDTA in the lead–acid cell forms organic acids which will accelerate corrosion of the lead plates and internal connectors.

The active materials change physical form during charge/discharge, resulting in growth and distortion of the electrodes, and shedding of electrodes into the electrolyte. Once the active material has fallen out of the plates, it cannot be restored into position by any chemical treatment. Similarly, internal physical problems such as cracked plates, corroded connectors, or damaged separators cannot be restored chemically.

== Corrosion problems ==
Corrosion of the external metal parts of the lead–acid battery results from a chemical reaction of the battery terminals, plugs, and connectors.

Corrosion on the positive terminal is caused by electrolysis, due to a mismatch of metal alloys used in the manufacture of the battery terminal and cable connector. White corrosion is usually lead or zinc sulfate crystals. Aluminum connectors corrode to aluminum sulfate. Copper connectors produce blue and white corrosion crystals. Corrosion of a battery's terminals can be reduced by coating the terminals with petroleum jelly or a commercially available product made for the purpose.

If the battery is overfilled with water and electrolyte, then thermal expansion can force some of the liquid out of the battery vents onto the top of the battery. This solution can then react with the lead and other metals in the battery connector and cause corrosion.

The electrolyte can seep from the plastic-to-lead seal where the battery terminals penetrate the plastic case.

Acid fumes that vaporize through the vent caps, often caused by overcharging, and insufficient battery box ventilation can allow the sulfuric acid fumes to build up and react with the exposed metals.

== See also ==
- Automotive battery
- Battery room
- Comparison of commercial battery types
- Dry cell
- History of the battery
- List of battery sizes
- List of battery types
- Silver–calcium battery
- UltraBattery
- Peukert's law
- Lithium-ion battery
- Vanadium redox battery
- Sodium-ion battery
- Sodium–sulfur battery
