= Automated charging machine =

Public charging station for mobile devices

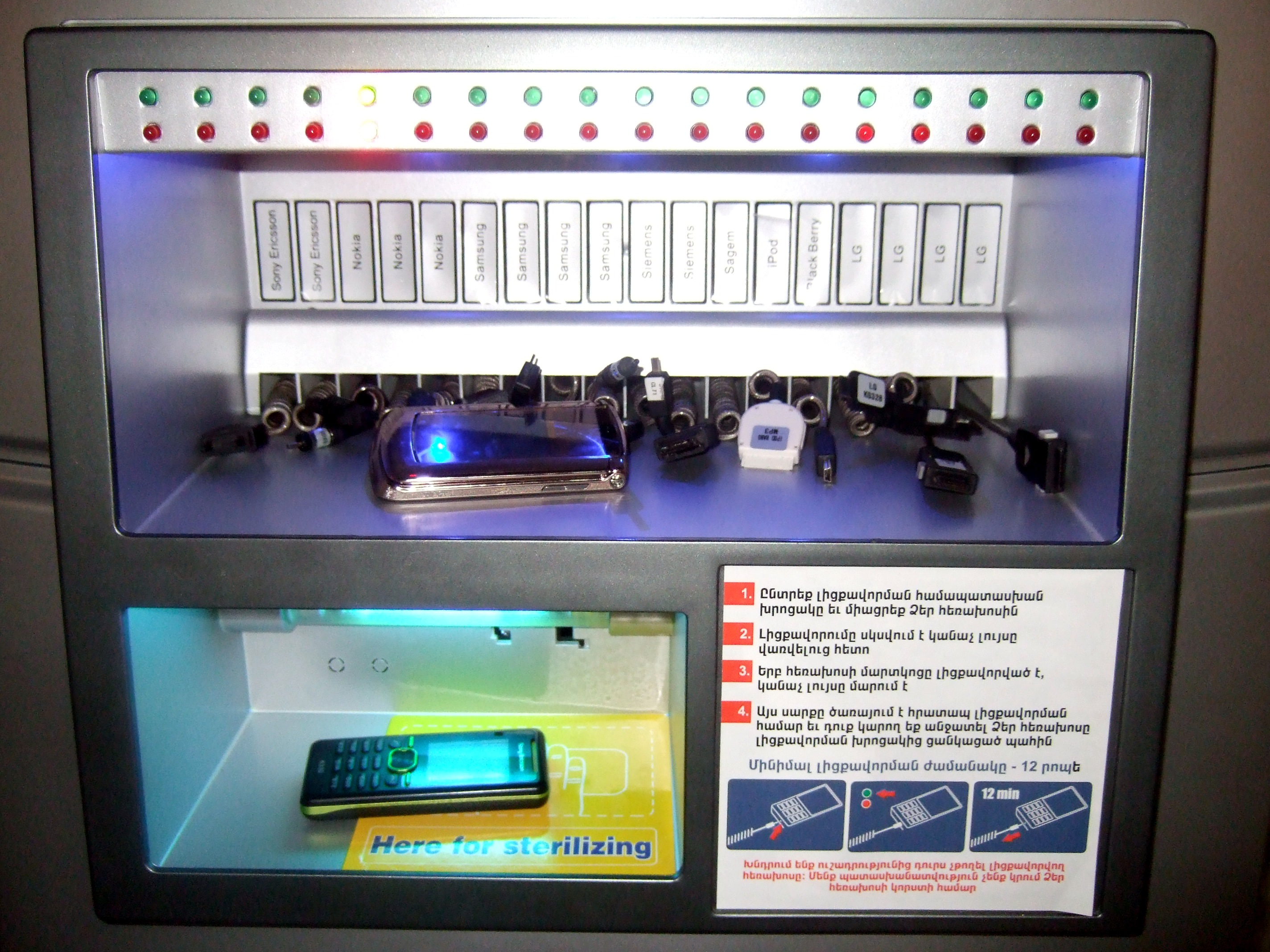
Cellphone charging at a free charging machine at Moscow Cinema in Yerevan.

An Automated Charging Machine (ACM) is an electronic machine that provides the public with the ability to recharge a mobile device, often for a small fee. Similar to vending machines, ACMs take cash, then charge the connected devices, which may be cell phones, PDAs, or other handheld devices. Usually, these machines charge much faster than normal chargers would charge them; some provide a charge in as little as 10 minutes.

== History ==
Public charging stations for mobile devices appeared around 2006. A variety of features have been introduced to these machines, including lockers, UV sanitation, and wirelessly updated advertising space. Since the introduction of the idea, an increasing number of companies are looking toward ACMs for vending and advertising revenue.

== Locations ==
ACMs are generally deployed in areas with a high amount of foot traffic, similar to vending machines and ATMs. These places include airports, shopping malls, parks, clubs, supermarkets, campuses, and other popular locations. Though is it unknown how many ACMs are in use around the world, they can be found in a variety of countries including the United States, England, and China.

== See also ==
- Chargebox
