= Research in lithium-ion batteries =

Research in lithium-ion batteries has produced many proposed refinements of lithium-ion batteries. Areas of research interest have focused on improving energy density, safety, rate capability, cycle durability, flexibility, and reducing cost.

Since the beginning of 2024, major smartphone companies have been switching to silicon-carbon batteries which utilize silicon anodes rather than traditional graphite anodes in lithium-ion batteries, which allows for higher energy density and longer run time.

Despite the advantages the technology has, companies like Samsung, Apple, and Google are still cautious about the use of it due to concerns about its silicon expansion, which may cause faster battery degrading, and even explosions under high pressure.

Artificial intelligence (AI) and machine learning (ML) is becoming popular in many fields including using it for lithium-ion battery research. These methods have been used in all aspects of battery research including materials, manufacturing, characterization, and prognosis/diagnosis of batteries.

== Negative electrode ==
Materials that are taken into consideration for the next generation lithium-ion battery (LIBs) negative electrode share common characteristics such as low cost, high theoretical specific capacity, and good electrical conductivity, etc. Carbon- and silicon- based materials have shown to be promising materials for the negative electrode. However, along with the desired characteristics from some of the materials, a number of weaknesses have also been shown. For example, although silicon has a theoretical specific capacity that is 10 times higher than graphite, it has low intrinsic electrical conductivity. Current research focuses on engineering materials so that their characteristics are retained and their weaknesses are accommodated.

Lithium-ion battery negative electrodes are most commonly made of graphite. Graphite anodes are limited to a theoretical capacity of 372 mAh/g for their fully lithiated state. At this time, significant other types of lithium-ion battery anode materials have been proposed and evaluated as alternatives to graphite, especially in cases where niche applications require novel approaches.

=== Si@void@C microreactor ===
Dr. Leon Shaw's research group from Illinois Institute of Technology has developed the Si@void@C microreactors which show exceptional test results to be LIBs anode. The process of creating Si@void@C microreactors begins with the production of nanostructured silicon particles through a high-energy ball milling process with micron-sized silicon powder. The nanostructured Si particles are then encapsulated with carbon through carbonization of a carbon precursor containing nitrogen element. Finally, the particles are etched with NaOH to create voids with nano-channel morphology inside the Si core to form the Si@void@C microreactors.

Tests from the Si@void@C microreactors demonstrated high Coulombic Efficiency of 91% during the first lithiation process, which is significantly higher than other reported silicon anodes. The design also enabled high Coulombic Efficiency of 100% after 5 cycles, indicating no discernible SEI layer formation beyond 5 cycles. Additionally, the specific capacity increased in subsequent cycles due to the activation of more electrode material, suggesting robust electrochemical stability.

The Si@void@C(N) electrode was tested to be capable of ultrafast charging and durability over 1000 cycles, the specific capacity maintained high levels (~800 mAh g^{−1}) even at very high current densities (up to 8 A g^{−1}). No lithium plating was observed for the Si@void@C(N) electrode even after 1000 cycles at 8 A g^{−1}, indicating their capability for ultrafast charging without compromising safety and capacity retention.

=== Intercalation oxides ===
Several types of metal oxides and sulfides can reversibly intercalate lithium cations at voltages between 1 and 2 V against lithium metal with little difference between the charge and discharge steps. Specifically the mechanism of insertion involves lithium cations filling crystallographic vacancies in the host lattice with minimal changes to the bonding within the host lattice. This differentiates intercalation negative electrode from conversion negative electrode that store lithium by complete disruption and formation of alternate phases, usually as lithia. Conversion systems typically disproportionate to lithia and a metal (or lower metal oxide) at low voltages, < 1 V vs Li, and reform the metal oxide at voltage > 2 V, for example, CoO + 2Li -> Co+Li_{2}O.

==== Titanium dioxide ====
In 1984, researchers at Bell Labs reported the synthesis and evaluation of a series of lithiated titanates. Of specific interest were the anatase form of titanium dioxide and the lithium spinel LiTi_{2}O_{4} Anatase has been observed to have a maximum capacity of 150 mAh/g (0.5Li/Ti) with the capacity limited by the availability of crystallographic vacancies in the framework. The TiO_{2} polytype brookite has also been evaluated and found to be electrochemically active when produced as nanoparticles with a capacity approximately half that of anatase (0.25Li/Ti). In 2014, researchers at Nanyang Technological University used a materials derived from a titanium dioxide gel derived from naturally spherical titanium dioxide particles into nanotubes In addition, a non-naturally occurring electrochemically active titanate referred to as TiO_{2}(B) can be made by ion-exchange followed by dehydration of the potassium titanate K_{2}Ti_{4}O_{9}. This layered oxide can be produced in multiple forms including nanowires, nanotubes, or oblong particles with an observed capacity of 210 mAh/g in the voltage window 1.5–2.0 V (vs Li).

==== Niobates ====
In 2011, Lu et al., reported reversible electrochemical activity in the porous niobate KNb_{5}O_{13}. This material inserted approximately 3.5Li per formula unit (about 125 mAh/g) at a voltage near 1.3 V (vs Li). This lower voltage (compared to titantes) is useful in systems where higher energy density is desirable without significant SEI formation as it operates above the typical electrolyte breakdown voltage. A high rate titanium niobate (TiNb_{2}O_{7}) was reported in 2011 by Han, Huang, and John B. Goodenough with an average voltage near 1.3 V (vs Li).

==== Niobium tungsten oxide ====
Niobium tungsten oxide is a Wadsley–Roth structure that is under investigation. It is a rhenium trioxide (ReO_{3})-type structure periodically interrupted by crystallographic shear planes. The result is continuous multi-dimensional tunnels that support rapid lithium-ion diffusion. At the shear planes, the niobium atoms share edges. These edges are structural and buffer volume expansion/contraction as lithium ions migrate.

==== Transition-metal oxides ====
In 2000, researchers from the Université de Picardie Jules Verne examined the use of nano-sized transition-metal oxides as conversion anode materials. The metals used were cobalt, nickel, copper, and iron, which proved to have capacities of 700 mAh/g and maintain full capacity for 100 cycles. The materials operate by reduction of the metal cation to either metal nanoparticles or to a lower oxidation state oxide. These promising results show that transition-metal oxides may be useful in ensuring the integrity of the lithium-ion battery over many discharge-recharge cycles.

=== Lithium ===
Lithium anodes were used for the first lithium-ion batteries in the 1960s, based on the TiS_{2}/Li cell chemistry, but were eventually replaced due to dendrite formation which caused internal short-circuits and was a fire hazard. Effort continued in areas that required lithium, including charged cathodes such as manganese dioxide, vanadium pentoxide, or molybdenum oxide and some polymer electrolyte based cell designs. The interest in lithium metal anodes was re-established with the increased interest in high capacity lithium–air battery and lithium–sulfur battery systems.

Research to inhibit dendrite formation has been an active area. Doron Aurbach and co-workers at Bar-Ilan University have extensively studied the role of solvent and salt in the formation of films on the lithium surface. Notable observations were the addition of LiNO_{3}, dioxolane, and hexafluoroarsenate salts. They appeared to create films that inhibit dendrite formation while incorporating reduced Li_{3}As as a lithium-ion conductive component.

In 2021, researchers announced the use of thin (20 micron) lithium metal strips. They were able to achieve energy density of 350 Wh/kg over 600 charge/discharge cycles.

=== Non-graphitic carbon ===
Various forms of carbon are used in lithium-ion battery cell configurations. Besides graphite poorly or non-electrochemically active types of carbon are used in cells such as CNTs, carbon black, graphene, graphene oxides, or MWCNTs.

Recent work includes efforts in 2014 by researchers at Northwestern University who found that metallic single-walled carbon nanotubes (SWCNTs) accommodate lithium much more efficiently than their semiconducting counterparts. If made denser, semiconducting SWCNT films take up lithium at levels comparable to metallic SWCNTs.

Hydrogen treatment of graphene nanofoam electrodes in LIBs was shown to improve their capacity and transport properties. Chemical synthesis methods used in standard anode manufacture leave significant amounts of atomic hydrogen. Experiments and multiscale calculations revealed that low-temperature hydrogen treatment of defect-rich graphene can improve rate capacity. The hydrogen interacts with the graphene defects to open gaps to facilitate lithium penetration, improving transport. Additional reversible capacity is provided by enhanced lithium binding near edges, where hydrogen is most likely to bind. Rate capacities increased by 17–43% at 200 mA/g. In 2015, researchers in China used porous graphene as the material for a lithium-ion battery anode in order to increase the specific capacity and binding energy between lithium atoms at the anode. The properties of the battery can be tuned by applying strain. The binding energy increases as biaxial strain is applied.

=== Silicon ===
Silicon is an earth abundant element, and is fairly inexpensive to refine to high purity. When alloyed with lithium it has a theoretical capacity of ~3,600 milliampere hours per gram (mAh/g), which is nearly 10 times the energy density of graphite electrodes, which exhibit a maximum capacity of 372 mAh/g for their fully lithiated state of LiC_{6}. One of silicon's inherent traits, unlike carbon, is the expansion of the lattice structure by as much as 400% upon full lithiation (charging). For bulk electrodes, this causes great structural stress gradients within the expanding material, inevitably leading to fractures and mechanical failure, which significantly limits the lifetime of the silicon anodes. In 2011, a group of researchers assembled data tables that summarized the morphology, composition, and method of preparation of those nanoscale and nanostructured silicon anodes, along with their electrochemical performance.

Porous silicon nanoparticles are more reactive than bulk silicon materials and tend to have a higher weight percentage of silica as a result of the smaller size. Porous materials allow for internal volume expansion to help control overall materials expansion. Methods include a silicon anode with an energy density above 1,100 mAh/g and a durability of 600 cycles that used porous silicon particles using ball-milling and stain-etching. In 2013, researchers developed a battery made from porous silicon nanoparticles. Below are various structural morphologies attempted to overcome issue with silicon's intrinsic properties.

The major obstacle in the commercialization of silicon as anode material for Li-ion battery is higher volumetric changes and formation of SEI. Recent research works have highlighted the strategies for the optimization and maintaining the structural stability of the electrode. Another aspect that contributes to fast anode degradation is the solid-electrolyte interface (SEI). During the first lithium insertion phase, the SEI forms on the electrode's surface and acts as a massive impediment between the electrode and the electrolyte. Because of this blockage, Lithium-ion conduction is permitted while functioning as an insulator, restricting additional electrolyte breakdown and keeping the lithium-ion battery's cycle performance from gradually declining. Everything from the most fundamental battery performance to the overall efficacy and cyclability of the LIB is influenced by the kind of SEI.

==== Silicon encapsulation ====
As a method to control the ability of fully lithiated silicon to expand and become electronically isolated, a method for caging 3 nm-diameter silicon particles in a shell of graphene was reported in 2016. The particles were first coated with nickel. Graphene layers then coated the metal. Acid dissolved the nickel, leaving enough of a void within the cage for the silicon to expand. The particles broke into smaller pieces, but remained functional within the cages.

In 2014, researchers encapsulated silicon nanoparticles inside carbon shells, and then encapsulated clusters of the shells with more carbon. The shells provide enough room inside to allow the nanoparticles to swell and shrink without damaging the shells, improving durability.

==== Silicon nanowire ====
In 2021 Paul V.Braun's group at University of Illinois at Urbana-Champaign developed a large-scale and low-cost approach for synthesizing Si/Cu nanowires. Firstly, Si/Cu/Zn ternary microspheres are prepared by a pulsed electrical discharging method in a scalable manner, and then Zn and partial Si in the microspheres was partially removed by chemical etching to form Si/Cu nanowires. This technology utilizes relatively cheap materials and flexible processing methods, costing approximately $0.3 g−1, which is promising to boost the yield of Si alloy NWs with low cost.

==== Porous-silicon inorganic-electrode design ====
In 2012, Vaughey, et al., reported a new all-inorganic electrode structure based on electrochemically active silicon particles bound to a copper substrate by a Cu_{3}Si intermetallic. Copper nanoparticles were deposited on silicon particles articles, dried, and laminated onto a copper foil. After annealing, the copper nanoparticles annealed to each other and to the copper current collector to produce a porous electrode with a copper binder once the initial polymeric binder burned out. The design had performance similar to conventional electrode polymer binders with exceptional rate capability owing to the metallic nature of the structure and current pathways.

==== Silicon nanofiber ====
In 2015, a prototype electrode was demonstrated that consists of sponge-like silicon nanofibers increases Coulombic efficiency and avoids the physical damage from silicon's expansion/contractions. The nanofibers were created by applying a high voltage between a rotating drum and a nozzle emitting a solution of tetraethyl orthosilicate (TEOS). The material was then exposed to magnesium vapors. The nanofibers contain 10 nm diameter nanopores on their surface. Along with additional gaps in the fiber network, these allow for silicon to expand without damaging the cell. Three other factors reduce expansion: a 1 nm shell of silicon dioxide; a second carbon coating that creates a buffer layer; and the 8-25 nm fiber size, which is below the size at which silicon tends to fracture.

Conventional lithium-ion cells use binders to hold together the active material and keep it in contact with the current collectors. These inactive materials make the battery bigger and heavier. Experimental binderless batteries do not scale because their active materials can be produced only in small quantities. The prototype has no need for current collectors, polymer binders or conductive powder additives. Silicon comprises over 80 percent of the electrode by weight. The electrode delivered 802 mAh/g after more than 600 cycles, with a Coulombic efficiency of 99.9 percent.

=== Tin ===
Lithium tin Zintl phases, discovered by Eduard Zintl, have been studied as anode materials in lithium-ion energy storage systems for several decades. First reported in 1981 by Robert Huggins, the system has a multiphase discharge curve and stores approximately 1000 mAh/g (Li_{22}Sn_{5}). Tin and its compounds have been extensively studied but, similar to silicon or germanium anode systems, issues associated with volume expansion (associated with gradual filling of p-orbitals and essential cation insertion), unstable SEI formation, and electronic isolation have been studied in an attempt to commercialize these materials. In 2013, work on morphological variation by researchers at Washington State University used standard electroplating processes to create nanoscale tin needles that show 33% lower volume expansion during charging. In 2015, the research team at University of Illinois at Urbana-Champaign create a 3D mechanically stable nickel–tin nanocomposite scaffold as a Li-ion battery anode. This scaffold can accommodate the volume change of a high-specific-capacity during operation. And nickel–tin anode is supported by an electrochemically inactive conductive scaffold with an engineered free volume and controlled characteristic dimensions, so the electrode with significantly improved cyclability.

=== Intermetallic insertion materials ===
As for oxide intercalation (or insertion) anode materials, similar classes of materials where the lithium cation is inserted into crystallographic vacancies within a metal host lattice have been discovered and studied since 1997. In general because of the metallic lattice, these types of materials, for example Cu_{6}Sn_{5}, Mn_{2}Sb, lower voltages and higher capacities have been found when compared to their oxide counterparts.

==== Cu_{6}Sn_{5} ====
Cu_{6}Sn_{5} is an intermetallic alloy with a defect NiAs type structure. In NiAs type nomenclature it would have the stoichiometry Cu_{0.2}CuSn, with 0.2 Cu atoms occupying a usually unoccupied crystallographic position in the lattice. These copper atoms are displaced to the grain boundaries when charged to form Li_{2}CuSn. With retention of most of the metal-metal bonding down to 0.5 V, Cu_{6}Sn_{5} has become an attractive potential anode material due to its high theoretical specific capacity, resistance against Li metal plating especially when compared to carbon-based anodes, and ambient stability. In this and related NiAs-type materials, lithium intercalation occurs through an insertion process to fill the two crystallographic vacancies in the lattice, at the same time as the 0.2 extra coppers are displaced to the grain boundaries. Efforts to charge compensate the main group metal lattice to remove the excess copper have had limited success. Although significant retention of structure is noted down to the ternary lithium compound Li_{2}CuSn, over discharging the material results in disproportionation with formation of Li_{22}Sn_{5} and elemental copper. This complete lithiation is accompanied by volume expansion of approximately 250%. Current research focuses on investigating alloying and low dimensional geometries to mitigate mechanical stress during lithiation. Alloying tin with elements that do not react with lithium, such as copper, has been shown to reduce stress. As for low dimensional applications, thin films have been produced with discharge capacities of 1127 mAhg^{−1} with excess capacity assigned to lithium ion storage at grain boundaries and associated with defect sites. Other approaches include making nanocomposites with Cu_{6}Sn_{5} at its core with a nonreactive outer shell, SnO_{2}-c hybrids have been shown to be effective, to accommodate volume changes and overall stability over cycles.

==== Copper antimonide ====
The layered intermetallic materials derived from the Cu_{2}Sb-type structure are attractive anode materials due to the open gallery space available and structural similarities to the discharge Li_{2}CuSb product. First reported in 2001. In 2011, researchers reported a method to create porous three dimensional electrodes materials based on electrodeposited antimony onto copper foams followed by a low temperature annealing step. It was noted to increase the rate capacity by lowering the lithium diffusion distances while increasing the surface area of the current collector. In 2015, researchers announced a solid-state 3-D battery anode using the electroplated copper antimonide (copper foam). The anode is then layered with a solid polymer electrolyte that provides a physical barrier across which ions (but not electrons) can travel. The cathode is an inky slurry. The volumetric energy density was up to twice as much energy conventional batteries. The solid electrolyte prevents dendrite formation.

=== Three-dimensional nanostructure ===
Nanoengineered porous electrodes have the advantage of short diffusion distances, room for expansion and contraction, and high activity. In 2006 an example of a three dimensional engineered ceramic oxide based on lithium titanate was reported that had dramatic rate enhancement over the non-porous analogue. Later work by Vaughey et al., highlighted the utility of electrodeposition of electroactive metals on copper foams to create thin film intermetallic anodes. These porous anodes have high power in addition to higher stability as the porous open nature of the electrode allows for space to absorb some of the volume expansion. In 2011, researchers at University of Illinois at Urbana-Champaign discovered that wrapping a thin film into a three-dimensional nanostructure can decrease charge time by a factor of 10 to 100. The technology is also capable of delivering a higher voltage output. In 2013, the team improved the microbattery design, delivering 30 times the energy density 1,000x faster charging. The technology also delivers better power density than supercapacitors. The device achieved a power density of 7.4 W/cm^{2}/mm. In 2019, the team develop a high areal and volumetric capacity 3D-structured tin-carbon anode by using a two steps electroplating process, which exhibits a high volumetric/areal capacity of ~879 mAh/cm^{3} and 6.59 mAh/cm^{2} after 100 cycles at 0.5 °C and 750 mAh/cm^{3} and 5.5 mAh/cm^{2} (delithiation) at 10 °C with a 20%v/v Sn loading in a half-cell configuration.

=== Semi-solid ===
In 2016, researchers announced an anode composed of a slurry of Lithium-iron phosphate and graphite with a liquid electrolyte. They claimed that the technique increased safety (the anode could be deformed without damage) and energy density. A flow battery without carbon, called Solid Dispersion Redox Flow Battery, was reported, proposing increased energy density and high operating efficiencies. A review of different semi-solid battery systems can be found here.

=== Redox-targeted solids ===
In 2007, Michael Gratzel and his co-workers at the University of Geneva reported lithium-ion batteries, where the electroactive solids are stored as pure (i.e. without binders, conductive additives, current collectors) powders in tanks, and washed by liquids with dissolved redox couples, capable of electron exchange with the electroactive solids, with a flow battery stack being added. Such devices are expected to provide a higher energy density than traditional batteries, but suffer from a lower energy efficiency.

== Cathode ==
Several varieties of cathode exist, but typically they can easily divided into two categories, namely charged and discharged. Charged cathodes are materials with pre-existing crystallographic vacancies. These materials, for instance spinels, vanadium pentoxide, molybdenum oxide or LiV_{3}O_{8}, typically are tested in cell configurations with a lithium metal anode as they need a source of lithium to function. While not as common in secondary cell designs, this class is commonly seen in primary batteries that do not require recharging, such as implantable medical device batteries. The second variety are discharged cathodes where the cathode typically in a discharged state (cation in a stable reduced oxidation state), has electrochemically active lithium, and when charged, crystallographic vacancies are created. Due to their increased manufacturing safety and without the need for a lithium source at the anode, this class is more commonly studied. Examples include lithium cobalt oxide, lithium nickel manganese cobalt oxide NMC, or lithium iron phosphate olivine which can be combined with most anodes such as graphite, lithium titanate spinel, titanium oxide, silicon, or intermetallic insertion materials to create a working electrochemical cell.

=== Vanadium oxides ===
Vanadium oxides have been a common class of cathodes to study due to their high capacity, ease of synthesis, and electrochemical window that matches well with common polymer electrolytes. Vanadium oxides cathodes, typically classed as charged cathodes, are found in many different structure types. These materials have been extensively studied by Stanley Whittingham among others. In 2007, Subaru introduced a battery with double the energy density while only taking 15 minutes for an 80% charge. They used a nanostructured vanadium oxide, which is able to load two to three times more lithium ions onto the cathode than the layered lithium cobalt oxide. In 2013 researchers announced a synthesis of hierarchical vanadium oxide nanoflowers (V_{10}O_{24}·nH_{2}O) synthesized by an oxidation reaction of vanadium foil in a NaCl aqueous solution. Electrochemical tests demonstrate deliver high reversible specific capacities with 100% coulombic efficiency, especially at high C rates (e.g., 140 mAh g^{−1} at 10 C). In 2014, researchers announced the use of vanadate-borate glasses (V_{2}O_{5} – LiBO_{2} glass with reduced graphite oxide) as a cathode material. The cathode achieved around 1000 Wh/kg with high specific capacities in the range of ~ 300 mAh/g for the first 100 cycles.

=== Disordered materials ===
In 2014, researchers at Massachusetts Institute of Technology found that creating high lithium content lithium-ion batteries materials with cation disorder among the electroactive metals could achieve 660 watt-hours per kilogram at 2.5 volts. The materials of the stoichiometry Li_{2}MO_{3}-LiMO_{2} are similar to the lithium rich lithium nickel manganese cobalt oxide (NMC) materials but without the cation ordering. The extra lithium creates better diffusion pathways and eliminates high energy transition points in the structure that inhibit lithium diffusion.

==== Glasses ====
In 2015 researchers blended powdered vanadium pentoxide with borate compounds at 900 C and quickly cooled the melt to form glass. The resulting paper-thin sheets were then crushed into a powder to increase their surface area. The powder was coated with reduced graphite oxide (RGO) to increase conductivity while protecting the electrode. The coated powder was used for the battery cathodes. Trials indicated that capacity was quite stable at high discharge rates and remained consistently over 100 charge/discharge cycles. Energy density reached around 1,000 watt-hours per kilogram and a discharge capacity that exceeded 300 mAh/g.

=== Sulfur ===
Used as the cathode for a lithium–sulfur battery this system has high capacity on the formation of Li_{2}S. In 2014, researchers at USC Viterbi School of Engineering used a graphite oxide coated sulfur cathode to create a battery with 800 mAh/g for 1,000 cycles of charge/discharge, over 5 times the energy density of commercial cathodes. Sulfur is abundant, low cost and has low toxicity. Sulfur has been a promising cathode candidate owing to its high theoretical energy density, over 10 times that of metal oxide or phosphate cathodes. However, sulfur's low cycle durability has prevented its commercialization. Graphene oxide coating over sulfur is claimed to solve the cycle durability problem. Graphene oxide high surface area, chemical stability, mechanical strength and flexibility.

=== Seawater ===
In 2012, researchers at Polyplus Corporation created a battery with an energy density more than triple that of traditional lithium-ion batteries using the halides or organic materials in seawater as the active cathode. Its energy density is 1,300 W·h/kg, which is a lot more than the traditional 400 W·h/kg. It has a solid lithium positive electrode and a solid electrolyte. It could be used in underwater applications.

=== Lithium-based cathodes ===
==== Lithium nickel manganese cobalt oxide ====
In 1998, a team from Argonne National Laboratory reported on the discovery of lithium rich NMC cathodes., These high-capacity high-voltage materials consist of nanodomains of the two structurally similar but different materials. On first charge, noted by its long plateau around 4.5 V (vs Li), the activation step creates a structure that gradually equilibrates to a more stable materials by cation re-positioning from high-energy points to lower-energy points in the lattice. The intellectual property surrounding these materials has been licensed to several manufacturers, including BASF, General Motors for the Chevrolet Volt and Chevrolet Bolt, and Toda. The mechanism for the high capacity and the gradual voltage fade has been extensively examined. It is generally believed the high-voltage activation step induces various cation defects that on cycling equilibrate through the lithium-layer sites to a lower energy state that exhibits a lower cell voltage but with a similar capacity,.

==== Lithium–iron phosphate ====
LiFePO_{4} is a 3.6 V lithium-ion battery cathode initially reported by John Goodenough and is structurally related to the mineral olivine and consists of a three dimensional lattice of an [FePO_{4}] framework surrounding a lithium cation. The lithium cation sits in a one dimensional channel along the [010] axis of the crystal structure. This alignment yields anisotropic ionic conductivity that has implications for its usage as a battery cathode and makes morphological control an important variable in its electrochemical cell rate performance. Although the iron analogue is the most commercial owing to its stability, the same composition exists for nickel, manganese, and cobalt although the observed high cell charging voltages and synthetic challenges for these materials make them viable but more difficult to commercialize. While the material has good ionic conductivity it possesses poor intrinsic electronic conductivity. This combination makes nanophase compositions and composites or coatings (to increase electronic conductivity of the whole matrix) with materials such as carbon advantageous. Alternatives to nanoparticles include mesoscale structure such as nanoball batteries of the olivine LiFePO_{4} that can have rate capabilities two orders of magnitude higher than randomly ordered materials. The rapid charging is related to the nanoballs high surface area where electrons are transmitted to the surface of the cathode at a higher rate.

In 2012, researchers at A123 Systems developed a battery that operates in extreme temperatures without the need for thermal management material. It went through 2,000 full charge-discharge cycles at 45 °C while maintaining over 90% energy density. It does this using a nanophosphate positive electrode.

==== Lithium manganese silicon oxide ====
A "lithium orthosilicate-related" cathode compound, Li_{2}MnSiO_{4}, was able to support a charging capacity of 335 mAh/g. Li_{2}MnSiO_{4}@C porous nanoboxes were synthesized via a wet-chemistry solid-state reaction method. The material displayed a hollow nanostructure with a crystalline porous shell composed of phase-pure Li_{2}MnSiO_{4} nanocrystals. Powder X-ray diffraction patterns and transmission electron microscopy images revealed that the high phase purity and porous nanobox architecture were achieved via monodispersed MnCO_{3}@SiO_{2} core–shell nanocubes with controlled shell thickness.

==== Air ====
In 2009, researchers at the University of Dayton Research Institute announced a solid-state battery with higher energy density that uses air as its cathode. When fully developed, the energy density could exceed 1,000 Wh/kg. In 2014, researchers at the School of Engineering at the University of Tokyo and Nippon Shokubai discovered that adding cobalt to the lithium oxide crystal structure gave it seven times the energy density. In 2017, researchers at University of Virginia reported a scalable method to produce sub-micrometer scale lithium cobalt oxide.

=== Transition Metal Fluorides (TMFs) ===
Transition metal fluorides (TMFs) form a metallic phase within a LiF matrix upon reacting with lithium. TMFs typically display poor electrochemical reversibility, and poor ionic and electronic conductivity. Although researchers are still working to understand the exact electrochemical reaction mechanisms of TMFs, there is a general agreement that the strong metal-fluoride ionic bond contributes to poor kinetics within battery cells. Among TMFs, iron fluoride is of particular interest because iron is Earth abundant and environmentally friendly compared to popular intercalation-type cathode materials, nickel and cobalt.

==== Iron Fluoride ====
Iron (II) fluoride (FeF_{2}) and iron (III) fluoride (FeF_{3}) have garnered recent interest as conversion-type cathode materials due to their high theoretical gravimetric energy densities and specific capacities, 571 mAh g^{−1} and 712 mAh g^{−1} respectively. This high energy density and capacity derives from iron fluorides' ability to transfer 2-3 electrons per Fe atom per reaction.

Decreasing particle size is one of the main methods researchers have used to overcome iron fluoride's insulating properties. Ball milling utilizes shear-forces to form fine particles which can improve conductivity by increasing particle surface area and reducing carrier pathlength to reaction sites. While there has been some success with ball milling, this method can lead to a non-uniform particle size distribution.

Another challenge with metal fluoride conversion cathodes includes volume expansion upon cycling. Volume expansion decreases the reversibility of reactions and cycle stability. In addition, volume expansion results in the mechanical fatigue and fracture of the metal/LiF matrix, and can ultimately lead to the failure of the cell. Recent success with solid polymer electrolytes (SPE) has increased the electrochemical stability and elasticity of the cathode electrolyte interface (CEI). Unlike traditional liquid electrolytes that form a thick, brittle CEI layer, these FeF_{2}-SPE cathodes form elastic CEI layers which are encapsulated by the elastic electrolyte and strong composite layer. The elastic SPE is able to withstand the volume expansion of FeF_{2} and carbon nanotubes (CNTs) strengthen the composite to prevent mechanical fatigue. Another technique to circumvent volume expansion includes creating a lithiated FeF_{3} nanocomposite with carbon. A lithiated FeF_{3}/C nanocomposite already contains lithium in close contact with FeF_{3}, therefore significantly reduces the stress/strain that occurs during lithiation upon the first cycle.

== Electrolyte ==
Currently, electrolytes are typically made of lithium salts in a liquid organic solvent. Common solvents are organic carbonates (cyclic, straight chain), sulfones, imides, polymers (polyethylene oxide) and fluorinated derivatives. Common salts include LiPF_{6}, LiBF_{4}, LiTFSI, and LiFSI. Research centers on increased safety via reduced flammability and reducing shorts via preventing dendrites.

=== Perfluoropolyether ===
In 2014, researchers at University of North Carolina found a way to replace the electrolyte's flammable organic solvent with nonflammable perfluoropolyether (PFPE). PFPE is usually used as an industrial lubricant, e.g., to prevent marine life from sticking to the ship bottoms. The material exhibited unprecedented high transference numbers and low electrochemical polarization, indicative of a higher cycle durability.

=== Solid-state ===
While no solid-state batteries have reached the market, multiple groups are researching this alternative. The notion is that solid-state designs are safer because they prevent dendrites from causing short circuits. They also have the potential to substantially increase energy density because their solid nature prevents dendrite formation and allows the use of pure metallic lithium anodes. They may have other benefits such as lower temperature operation.

In 2015, researchers announced an electrolyte using superionic lithium-ion conductors, which are compounds of lithium, germanium, phosphorus and sulfur.

==== Thiophosphate ====
In 2015, researchers worked with a lithium carbon fluoride battery. They incorporated a solid lithium thiophosphate electrolyte wherein the electrolyte and the cathode worked in cooperation, resulting in capacity 26 percent. Under discharge, the electrolyte generates a lithium fluoride salt that further catalyzes the electrochemical activity, converting an inactive component to an active one. More significantly, the technique was expected to substantially increase battery life.

==== Glassy electrolytes ====
In March 2017, researchers announced a solid-state battery with a glassy ferroelectric electrolyte of lithium, oxygen, and chlorine ions doped with barium, a lithium metal anode, and a composite cathode in contact with a copper substrate. A spring behind the copper cathode substrate holds the layers together as the electrodes change thickness. The cathode comprises particles of sulfur "redox center", carbon, and electrolyte. During discharge, the lithium ions plate the cathode with lithium metal and the sulfur is not reduced unless irreversible deep discharge occurs. The thickened cathode is a compact way to store the used lithium. During recharge, this lithium moves back into the glassy electrolyte and eventually plates the anode, which thickens. No dendrites form. The cell has 3 times the energy density of conventional lithium-ion batteries. An extended life of more than 1,200 cycles was demonstrated. The design also allows the substitution of sodium for lithium minimizing lithium environmental issues.

=== Salts ===
==== Superhalogen ====
Conventional electrolytes generally contain halogens, which are toxic. In 2015 researchers claimed that these materials could be replaced with non-toxic superhalogens with no compromise in performance. In superhalogens the vertical electron detachment energies of the moieties that make up the negative ions are larger than those of any halogen atom. The researchers also found that the procedure outlined for Li-ion batteries is equally valid for other metal-ion batteries, such as sodium-ion or magnesium-ion batteries.

==== Water-in-salt ====
In 2015, researchers at the University of Maryland and the Army Research Laboratory showed significantly increased stable potential windows for aqueous electrolytes with very high salt concentration. By increasing the molality of Bis(trifluoromethane)sulfonimide lithium salt to 21 m, the potential window could be increased from 1.23 to 3 V due to the formation of SEI on the anode electrode, which has previously only been accomplished with non-aqueous electrolytes. Using aqueous rather than organic electrolyte could significantly improve the safety of Li-ion batteries.

==== Dual anionic liquid ====
An experimental lithium metal battery with a LiNi_{0.88}Co_{0.09}Mn_{0.03}O_{2}/NCM88 cathode material with a dual-anion ionic liquid electrolyte (ILE) 0.8Pyr_{14}FSI_{0.2}LiTFSI was demonstrated in 2021. This electrolyte enables initial specific capacity of 214 mAh g−1 and 88% capacity retention over 1,000 cycles with an average Coulombic efficiency of 99.94%. The cells achieved a specific energy above 560 Wh kg−1 at >4 volts. Capacity after 1k cycles was 88%. Importantly, the cathode retained its structural integrity throughout the charging cycles.

== Management ==
=== Charging ===
In 2014, researchers at MIT, Sandia National Laboratories, Samsung Advanced Institute of Technology America and Lawrence Berkeley National Laboratory discovered that uniform charging could be used with increased charge speed to speed up battery charging. This discovery could also increase cycle durability to ten years. Traditionally slower charging prevented overheating, which shortens cycle durability. The researchers used a particle accelerator to learn that in conventional devices each increment of charge is absorbed by a single or a small number of particles until they are charged, then moves on. By distributing charge/discharge circuitry throughout the electrode, heating and degradation could be reduced while allowing much greater power density.

In 2014, researchers at Qnovo developed software for a smartphone and a computer chip capable of speeding up re-charge time by a factor of 3-6, while also increasing cycle durability. The technology is able to understand how the battery needs to be charged most effectively, while avoiding the formation of dendrites.

In 2019, Chao-Yang Wang from Penn State University found that it is possible to recharge the (conventional) lithium-ion batteries of EV's in under 10 minutes. He did so by heating the battery to 60 °C, recharging it and then cooling if quickly afterwards. This causes only very little damage to the batteries. Professor Wang used a thin nickel foil with one end attached to the negative terminal and the other end extending to outside the cell in order to create a third terminal. A temperature sensor attached to a switch completes the circuit.

==== Photo-rechargeable batteries ====
In photorechargeable batteries (PRBs), illumination drives the removal of lithium from the cathode, allowing the battery to recharge without a separate photovoltaic cell. This approach combines light-to-electricity conversion and energy storage within a single two-electrode device, potentially reducing energy losses and simplifying system design. The cathode material must be both electrochemically active and capable of generating or accepting long-lived charge carriers under illumination.

In 2022, K. Shimokawa et al. found that spinel lithium manganese oxide (LiMn_{2}O_{4}, LMO) combined with titanium dioxide (TiO_{2}) nanoparticles can release lithium ions when illuminated in a water-in-salt electrolyte, using an electron acceptor to enhance charge separation. Similarly, in 2019, A. Lee et al. found that LiMn_{2}O_{4} electrodes exposed to white light show accelerated conventional charging, attributed to microsecond-lived charge-separated states detected by transient absorption and electron paramagnetic resonance techniques. In 2017, A. Paolella et al. found that lithium iron phosphate (LiFePO_{4}, LFP) nanocrystals sensitized with organic dyes can undergo light-driven delithiation, demonstrating that photo-generated holes can assist conventional cathode materials. In 2021, B. D. Boruah et al. studied vanadium pentoxide (V_{2}O_{5}) nanofibers with conductive polymers, and in 2023 A. Kumar et al. studied lateral TiS_{2}–TiO_{2} heterostructures, and in 2024 L. Chen et al. studied aluminum-polyaniline (Al-PANI) systems, each achieving capacity enhancements and photocharging efficiencies ranging from ≪0.1% to several percent under specific illumination conditions.

Common experimental methods used in studying PRBs include photoelectrochemical characterization with controlled illumination sources and structural and compositional analyses such as x-ray diffraction, x-ray photoelectron spectroscopy, x-ray absorption spectroscopy, and transmission electron microscopy to confirm light-induced ion movement and material stability.

PRBs remain a developing field, as studies continue to investigate anode and electrolyte improvements, charge recombination losses, material durability, improvements for commercialization, and standardize testing across studies for comparison.

=== Durability ===
In 2014, independent researchers from Canada announced a battery management system that increased cycles four-fold, that with specific energy of 110–175 Wh/kg using a battery pack architecture and controlling algorithm that allows it to fully utilize the active materials in battery cells. The process maintains lithium-ion diffusion at optimal levels and eliminates concentration polarization, thus allowing the ions to be more uniformly attached/detached to the cathode. The SEI layer remains stable, preventing energy density losses.

=== Thermal ===
In 2016, researchers announced a reversible shutdown system for preventing thermal runaway. The system employed a thermoresponsive polymer switching material. This material consists of electrochemically stable, graphene-coated, spiky nickel nanoparticles in a polymer matrix with a high thermal expansion coefficient. Film electrical conductivity at ambient temperature was up to 50 S cm−1. Conductivity decreases within one second by 10^{7}-10^{8} at the transition temperature and spontaneously recovers at room temperature. The system offers 10^{3}–10^{4}x greater sensitivity than previous devices.

=== Flexibility ===
In 2014, multiple research teams and vendors demonstrated flexible battery technologies for potential use in textiles and other applications.

One technique made li-ion batteries flexible, bendable, twistable and crunchable using the Miura fold. This discovery uses conventional materials and could be commercialized for foldable smartphones and other applications.

Another approached used carbon nanotube fiber yarns. The 1 mm diameter fibers were claimed to be lightweight enough to create weavable and wearable textile batteries. The yarn was capable of storing nearly 71 mAh/g. Lithium manganate (LMO) particles were deposited on a carbon nanotube (CNT) sheet to create a CNT-LMO composite yarn for the cathode. The anode composite yarns sandwiched a CNT sheet between two silicon-coated CNT sheets. When separately rolled up and then wound together separated by a gel electrolyte the two fibers form a battery. They can also be wound onto a polymer fiber, for adding to an existing textile. When silicon fibers charge and discharge, the silicon expands in volume up to 300 percent, damaging the fiber. The CNT layer between the silicon-coated sheet buffered the silicon's volume change and held it in place.

A third approach produced rechargeable batteries that can be printed cheaply on commonly used industrial screen printers. The batteries used a zinc charge carrier with a solid polymer electrolyte that prevents dendrite formation and provides greater stability. The device survived 1,000 bending cycles without damage.

A fourth group created a device that is one hundredth of an inch thick and doubles as a supercapacitor. The technique involved etching a 900 nanometer-thick layer of Nickel(II) fluoride with regularly spaced five nanometer holes to increase capacity. The device used an electrolyte made of potassium hydroxide in polyvinyl alcohol. The device can also be used as a supercapacitor. Rapid charging allows supercapacitor-like rapid discharge, while charging with a lower current rate provides slower discharge. It retained 76 percent of its original capacity after 10,000 charge-discharge cycles and 1,000 bending cycles. Energy density was measured at 384 Wh/kg, and power density at 112 kW/kg.

=== Volume expansion ===
Current research has been primarily focused on finding new materials and characterising them by means of specific capacity (mAh/g), which provides a good metric to compare and contrast all electrode materials. Recently, some of the more promising materials are showing some large volume expansions which need to be considered when engineering devices. Lesser known to this realm of data is the volumetric capacity (mAh/cm^{3}) of various materials to their design.

=== Nanotechnology ===
Researchers have taken various approaches to improving performance and other characteristics by using nanostructured materials. One strategy is to increase electrode surface area. Another strategy is to reduce the distance between electrodes to reduce transport distances. Yet another strategy is to allow the use of materials that exhibit unacceptable flaws when used in bulk forms, such as silicon.

Finally, adjusting the geometries of the electrodes, e.g., by interdigitating anode and cathode units variously as rows of anodes and cathodes, alternating anodes and cathodes, hexagonally packed 1:2 anodes:cathodes and alternating anodic and cathodic triangular poles. One electrode can be nested within another.

Carbon nanotubes and nanowires have been examined for various purposes, as have aerogels and other novel bulk materials.

Finally, various nanocoatings have been examined, to increase electrode stability and performance.

Nanosensors is now being integrated in to each cell of the battery. This will help to monitor the state of charge in real time which will be helpful not only for security reason but also be useful to maximize the use of the battery.

== Economy ==
In 2016, researchers from CMU found that prismatic cells are more likely to benefit from production scaling than cylindrical cells.

== Repurposing and reuse ==
The elimination of power batteries made by lithium-ion batteries has largely increased, causing environmental protection threats and waste of resources. About 100-120 GWh of electric vehicle batteries will be retired by 2030. Hence, recycling and reuse of such retired power batteries have been suggested. Some retired power batteries still have ~80% of their initial capacity. So they can be repurposed and reused as second-life applications, for instance, to serve the batteries in the energy storage systems. Governments in different countries have acknowledged this emergent problem and prepared to launch their policies to deal with repurposed batteries, such as coding principles, traceability management system, manufacturing factory guidelines, dismantling process guidelines, residual energy measurement, tax credits, rebates, and financial support.

Standards for second-life applications of retired electric vehicle batteries are still emerging technology. One of the few standards, UL 1974, was published by Underwriters Laboratories (UL). The document gives a general procedure of the safety operations and performance tests on retired power battery cells, packs, and modules, but could not detail the steps and specifics. For applications in the real world, the design, form factor, and materials of the existing battery cells, packs, and modules often vary greatly from one another. It is difficult to develop a unified technical procedure. Furthermore, information on the detailed technical procedures applied is usually not available in the open literature, except for Schneider et al. who demonstrated the procedure to refurbish small cylindrical NiMH batteries used in mobile phones, Zhao who published the successful experiences of some grid-oriented applications of electric vehicle lithium-ion batteries in China, and Chung who reported the procedure described in UL 1974 on a LiFePO_{4} repurposing battery.

== See also ==
- Lithium–sulfur battery
- Trickle charging
