= Battery simulator =

Test device

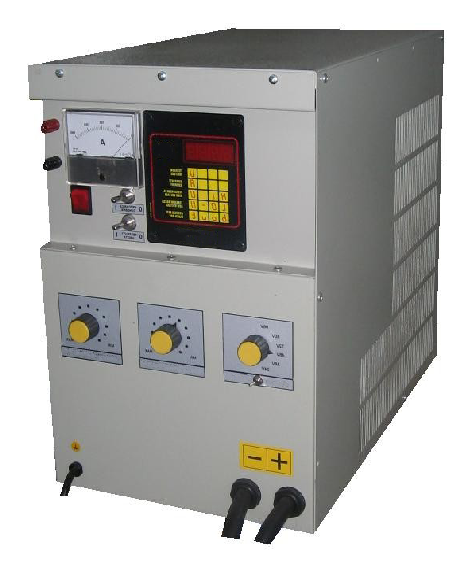
Amperis Battery simulator

A battery simulator is an electronic device designed to test battery chargers by simulating the behavior of a battery during the charging process.

== Characteristics ==
Highlights in the battery simulator are the IGBT or MOSFET high frequency regulator (which allows the equipment to work with constant current and voltage), the programmable digital panel.

A battery simulator may have the following features:

- An IGBT or MOSFET high frequency regulator
- Digital voltmeter
- Analogue ammeter
- Test voltage selector
- Potentiometer fine tension adjustment.
- Potentiometer current selection (0-200 A)
- self-test
- Automatic stop in case of failure
- Thermal protection in case of overtemperature

== Functioning ==
Battery simulator mimics a battery's electrical characteristic of outputting a voltage and is able to source as well as sink current. This type of power supply is called two-quadrant power supply. In contrast, a conventional power supply can only source current when the voltage is positive.

A battery simulator may be able to set the simulated battery voltage either remotely via PC or manually. Often battery simulators have built-in voltage and current display and monitoring. For example, the user selects the voltage of the battery to be simulated, using the potentiometer knob for adjusting the voltage, while the current value is displayed on the digital screen. An independent potentiometer is available to select the maximum current that the equipment can source or sink.

=== Battery charger testing ===
The basic use of battery simulator is replacing a real battery with a simulator. This enables the testing of the charger both during development and during production testing.

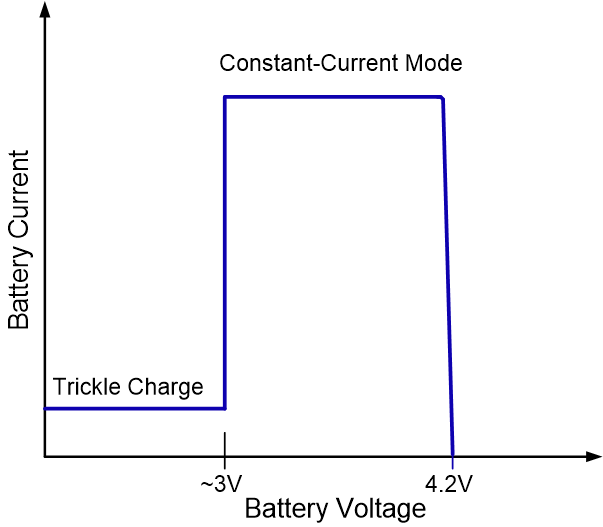
Lithium ion charger voltage/current profile obtained using a battery simulator.

Once the simulated battery voltage is set, the user connects the charger to be tested to the input of the simulator. The charger will detect that a battery has been connected and the charging process will begin. The simulator keeps the voltage constant at the set value, while the analogue ammeter indicates the charging current. If the battery simulator has a current limit feature and if the current exceeds the maximum set value, the simulator automatically increases the voltage to limit the current

The advantage of using a battery simulator is its ability to freely set the emulated battery voltage to any value in order to test the charger. For example, a real charger profile curved is obtained by sweeping the simulator voltage while recording its voltage and current. The figure to the right shows a typical Lithium ion charging profile curve obtained by using a battery simulator. The profile curve of the charger is obtained in a few minutes.
