= Solid electrolyte interphase =

The solid electrolyte interphase (SEI) is a passivating layer that forms on the surface of negative electrodes in lithium-ion batteries through decomposition of the electrolyte during the first charging cycles. The layer is electronically insulating but conductive to lithium ions, which suppresses further electrolyte reduction while allowing the cell to operate. The term was coined by Emanuel Peled in 1979 in a model of alkali-metal electrodes in nonaqueous electrolytes. The SEI is a general feature of lithium- and sodium-based batteries rather than a property of any single electrode material, governing the performance of graphite, lithium-metal and silicon anodes alike, and has been described as "the most important and the least understood solid electrolyte in rechargeable Li batteries".

== History ==
Before the SEI model, charge transfer at lithium electrodes was commonly described in terms of direct electron transfer from the metal to cations in the solution. In 1979, Peled proposed that in practical nonaqueous battery systems alkali and alkaline earth metals are instantly covered by a surface layer with the properties of a solid electrolyte, and that this interphase controls the corrosion rate, the deposition–dissolution kinetics, the quality of the metal deposit and the half-cell potential. The model was later described as a cornerstone of lithium battery science, enabling safer, more durable and higher-power cells.

== Formation ==
SEI formation begins when the negative electrode is driven below the reduction potential of the electrolyte, typically below approximately 1 V against Li/Li⁺ on graphite. Electrolyte solvents and salts are reduced at the electrode surface, and their insoluble decomposition products deposit to form the layer; the thickness of a freshly formed film is limited by the electron-tunneling range. Practical electrolytes are therefore designed to contain at least one component — such as ethylene carbonate or a film-forming additive — that reacts with the anode to build a protective interphase. The formation of the layer consumes lithium irreversibly and reduces first-cycle efficiency.

== Structure and composition ==
The layer has a heterogeneous, mosaic-like structure consisting of an inorganic inner region containing compounds such as lithium fluoride and lithium carbonate, and a more porous organic outer region composed of alkyl carbonates and polymers. In 1997, Peled and co-workers extended the original model into a mosaic multilayer picture in which the simultaneous precipitation of several reduction products produces adjacent phases with different ionic conductivities. Surface analyses by X-ray photoelectron spectroscopy and infrared spectroscopy have shown that the composition and morphology of the layer depend strongly on the electrolyte formulation, operating temperature and cycling history.

== Properties and function ==
The SEI behaves as a solid electrolyte: it is an electronic insulator but a lithium-ion conductor, so it terminates its own growth while permitting reversible lithium transport. The presence of a stable SEI is required for the operation of graphite anodes, as it prevents sustained solvent co-intercalation and decomposition that would otherwise exfoliate the graphite.

== Effects on battery performance ==
The quality of the SEI determines irreversible charge loss, rate capability, cyclability, safety and shelf life of the cell. On silicon anodes, the large volume changes of the material cause repeated fracture of the film, making SEI stability a major focus of anode research (see Lithium–silicon battery). Repeated rupture and reformation of the layer during cycling can also lead to the growth of needle-like lithium deposits known as dendrites, which can cause internal short circuits. The continued slow growth of the layer over the life of the cell is a major contributor to capacity fade and increasing internal resistance.

== Characterization and modeling ==
Because the SEI is thin and chemically sensitive, its study has relied heavily on surface-sensitive techniques such as X-ray photoelectron spectroscopy and infrared spectroscopy. In 2017, cryogenic electron microscopy revealed the atomic structure of the interphase on lithium-metal anodes without beam damage. The formation and growth of the SEI have also been modeled theoretically to predict capacity fade and cell lifetime.

== Similar interphases ==
Similar interphases form in sodium-ion batteries and at positive electrodes, where they are often termed the cathode electrolyte interphase.
