= Lithium plating =

Deposition of metallic lithium

Overview
- Field: Electrochemistry, battery engineering

Conditions

Effects
- Safety: Growth of dendrites and internal short circuits
- Electrode: Thickening of the solid electrolyte interphase

Detection and mitigation

Lithium plating is the deposition of metallic lithium on the negative electrode of a lithium-ion cell, rather than insertion of lithium ions into the electrode material. It occurs mainly during high-rate or low-temperature charging and reduces capacity and Coulombic efficiency;the deposit can grow into dendrites that cause internal short circuits.

== Mechanism ==
Plating occurs when lithium ions reach the negative electrode faster than they are inserted into the host material. The reaction competes with intercalation into graphite and is promoted by low temperature, high current and high state of charge.

== Occurrence in commercial cells ==
Measurements on three-electrode pouch cells show that plating increases with charging rate and decreases with cell temperature. The deposit is spatially inhomogeneous; part is re-inserted during slow discharge, while the remainder is electrically isolated and reacts with the electrolyte, thickening the solid electrolyte interphase.

== Detection ==
Plating is detected by high-precision coulometry and confirmed post mortem by microscopic or optical examination of the anode.

== Mitigation ==
Mitigation includes charge-rate limits at low temperature and high state of charge, cell heating during fast charging, and modified electrolyte composition. The onset of plating constrains the maximum charging rate and extreme fast charging of commercial cells.
