= Moixa =

British technology company

Moixa Energy Holdings Ltd
- Type: Private
- Industry: Design, Technology and Research
- Founded: 2004; 22 years ago
- Founders: Simon Daniel; Chris Wright
- Headquarters: London, England, UK
- Key people: David Thomlinson; (Chairman); Simon Daniel; (Chief executive officer); Chris Wright; (Chief technology officer)
- Products: Consumer Technology
- Website: www.moixa.com

Moixa is a British cleantech company that develops software and hardware to optimise use of renewable energy. They produce smart batteries that are paired with residential solar panels. The company also designs "GridShare" Software which optimises battery systems, and can also be used to create virtual power plants (VPP) with other batteries, as in the work they do in Japan with ITOCHU. GridShare Software can also be used to add intelligence to other battery and EV Chargers to help use energy more efficiently and reduce the costs to the household. They have about 70 employees in London.

== History ==
The company originally launched the Moixa Energy brand to produce a NiMH rechargeable battery called USBCell. The batteries included a USB connector to allow recharging using a powered USB port. The USBCell AA product, launched on 19 September 2006. Since then, the company has discontinued the USBCell and now focusses on clean technologies in the energy storage and smart charging domain.

== Moixa Smart Battery ==
Moixa Smart Battery systems are designed to be installed alongside solar panels to maximise the use of solar energy in the home and lower the owner's energy bills. As soon as solar PV starts generating more energy than the household needs, the battery will fill from excess solar and it will discharge when the household needs more energy than the solar can cover. The battery can also be charged from lower-cost grid energy for homes on time-of-use tariffs, bringing additional benefits. The battery comes with web and mobile apps which allows owners to view their energy generation and usage. The Moixa Smart Battery Systems are sold in the UK and via Energia in Ireland.

== GridShare Software ==
Moixa develops GridShare Software to work alongside energy storage and smart charging products. The software can be used to optimise individual devices by making smart charging plans for batteries and EV Chargers and the software can also be used to aggregate energy storage devices together to create a VPP and deliver grid services. The software is currently embedded on their own devices and is used to deliver grid services to UKPN. It is also integrated with thousands of ITOCHU devices in Japan and is supporting Honda with their smart EV Charging ambition in Europe.

== Previous products ==
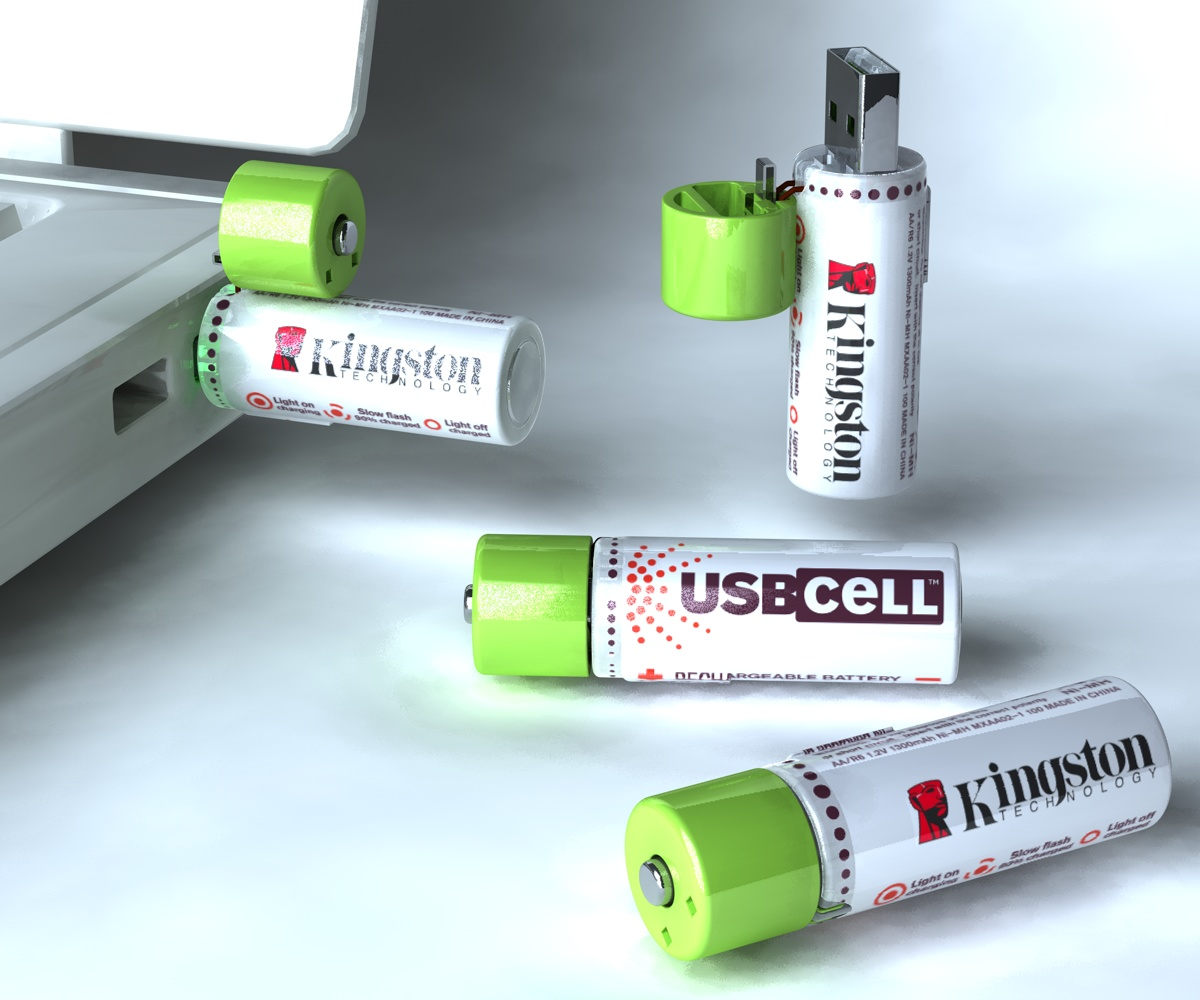
USBCell Batteries

The USBCell is a rechargeable battery-powered by a USB connection to any applicable device. Launched in 2006, the USBCell has been sold in over 50 countries. It can charge to 90% in 5 hours and contains a 1.2V 1300mAh battery. It can also be charged in standard rechargeable NiMH chargers alongside standard rechargeable batteries. The USBCell is no longer for sale.

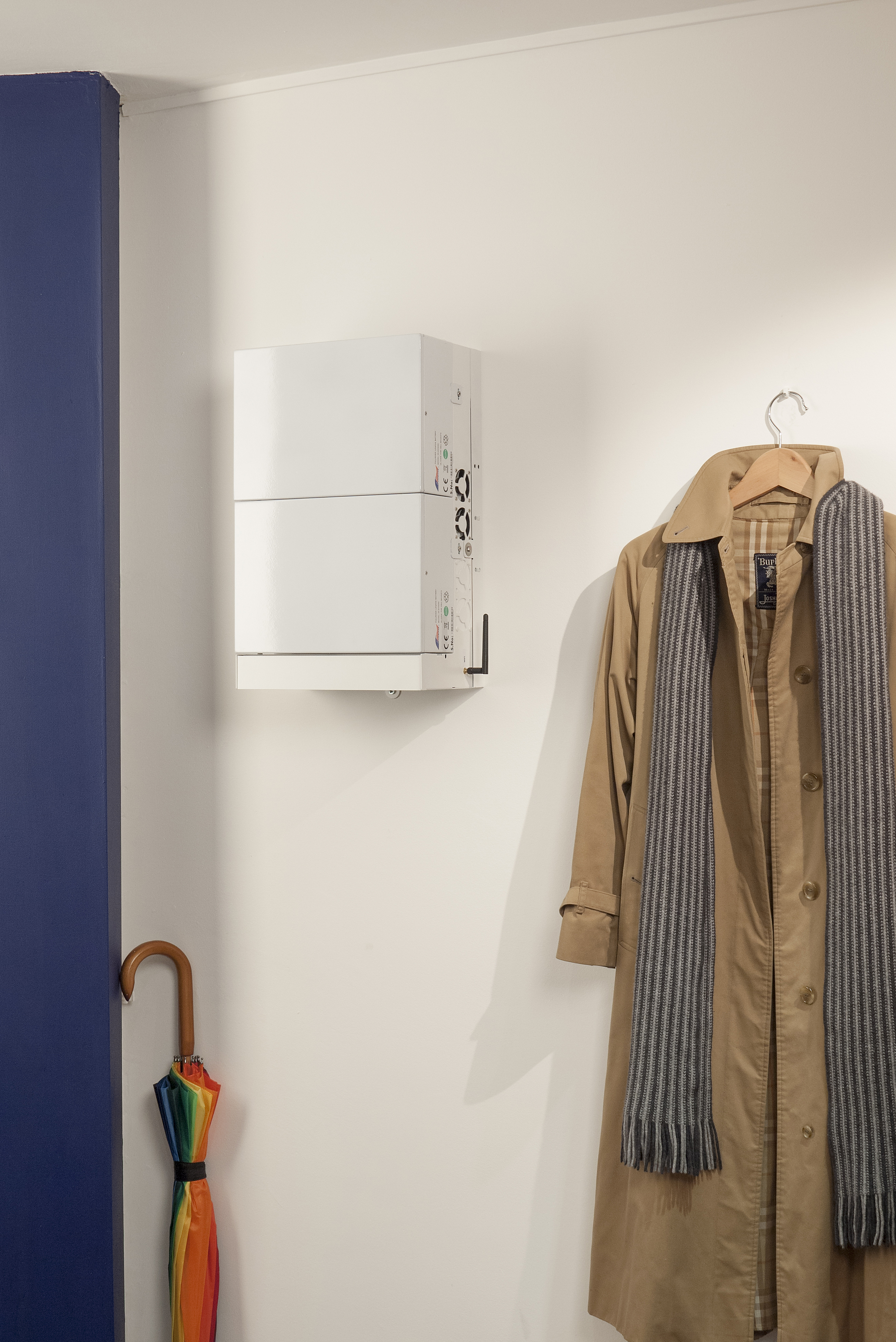
A 2 kWh unit mounted on a wall.

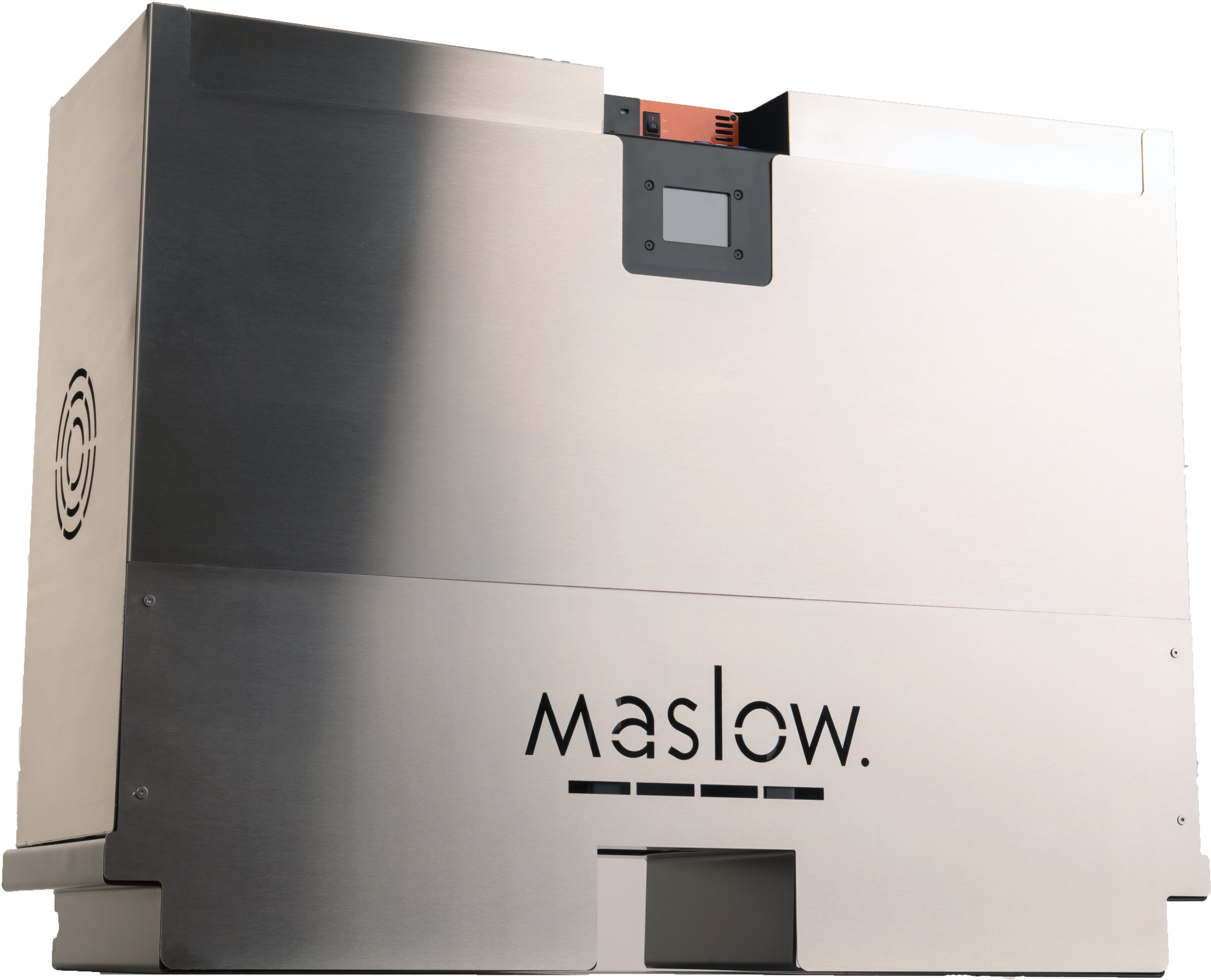
4-6 kWh Maslow unit

Maslow is a building-based home energy storage solution that works with existing photovoltaic panels to reduce energy consumption and offset power consumption to off-peak times. Using batteries charged through PV panels or the grid at off-peak times, the power is then discharged at peak times to reduce costs. The unit can support both AC and DC networks.

The Maslow unit has now been replaced by other battery products. Moixa currently sells a 4.8kWh Moixa Smart Battery in the UK and have a 7.2kWh and 9.6kWh Moixa Optimised Battery System on trial. All units are designed for residential properties to work alongside solar panels and they can also be charged using a time-of-use tariff.

== Awards ==
- UK National Energy Efficiency Award 2007 – USBCell
- Innovation in Engineering Awards 2007 – Moixa
- PocketLint – Green Gadget of the Year 2007 – Winner
- Pocket-Lint Best Green Gadget 2007 – Winner
- Barclays Commercial 'Green Leaders in Business' 2008 – MoixaEnergy
- Observer Ethical Awards 2008 – Ethical Products finalist – USBCell
- Computerworld Honors Programme Energy and Environment Finalist 2008 – Moixa Energy
- iF Gold Product Design Award 2008 International Product Design – USBCell
- Rosenblatt New Energy Awards 2008 Entrepreneur of the Year – Simon Daniel
- European Office Product Awards 2008 – USBCell
- 2019 – Global Cleantech 100
