= Passivation =

Passivation may refer to:

- Passivation (chemistry)
- Passivation (spacecraft)
- Feedback passivation, a concept in nonlinear control
