= Simon Daniel =

2022 Indian film by Sajan Antony

- Directed by: Sajan Antony
- Written by: Rakesh Kuriakose
- Produced by: Jithin Jose; Ramesh Kuriakose
- Starring: Vineeth Kumar; Divya Pillai
- Cinematography: Sajan Antony
- Edited by: Deepu Joseph
- Music by: Varun Krishna
- Production company: Migress Productions
- Release date: 19 August 2022
- Country: India
- Language: Malayalam

Simon Daniel is a 2022 Indian crime thriller Malayalam film directed by Sajan Antony featuring Vineeth Kumar and Divya Pillai in lead roles.

== Cast ==
- Vineeth Kumar as Simon Daniel
- Divya Pillai as Stella
- Vijeesh Vijayan as Santhosh
- V. K. Sreeraman as Divakaran Maash
- Sunil Sukhada as Avarachan
- Shine Thomas as Vinod
- Keerthi Krishna as Varsha
- Favour Francis as Mathews
- Rajani Murali as Seethamma
- Vivek Vishwam as SI Renjith
- Arjun as Udumban
- Baby Devananda as Catherine
- Master Navneeth as Nandu
- Marin D. as Margaret
- Jissi Lijo as Catherine’s mom
- Dr. Sathya Narayana Unni as Tharavadi
- Shivani Shiva as Reshma
- Lijo Luis as Constable Shameer
- Vinod Guruvayoor as Avarachan’s driver
