= Nanowire battery =

Type of battery

A nanowire battery uses nanowires to increase the surface area of one or both of its electrodes, which improves the capacity of the battery. Some designs (silicon, germanium and transition metal oxides), variations of the lithium-ion battery have been announced, although none are commercially available. All of the concepts replace the traditional graphite anode and could improve battery performance. Each type of nanowire battery has specific advantages and disadvantages, but a challenge common to all of them is their fragility.

== Silicon ==
Silicon is an attractive material for applications as lithium battery anodes because of its discharge potential and high theoretical charge capacity (ten times higher than that of typical graphite anodes currently used in industry). Nanowires could improve these properties by increasing the amount of available surface area in contact with the electrolyte, increasing the anode's power density and allowing for faster charging and discharging. However, silicon swells by up to 400% as it alloys with lithium during charging, causing it to break down. This volume expansion occurs anisotropically, caused by crack propagation immediately following a moving lithiation front. These cracks result in pulverization and substantial capacity loss noticeable within the first few cycles.

Nanowires may help mitigate the volume expansion. The small nanowire diameter allows for improved accommodation of volume changes during lithiation. Another advantage is that, because all nanowire are attached to the current collector, they can serve as direct pathways for charge transport. By contrast, in particle-based electrodes, charges are forced to move from particle to particle, a less efficient process. Silicon nanowires have a theoretical capacity of roughly 4,200 mAh g^{−1}, larger than that of other forms of silicon and much larger than that of graphite (372 mAh g^{−1}).

Like graphite anodes, silicon anodes form passivation layers (solid-electrolyte interphases) on their surfaces during the first charge cycle. Coating silicon nanowires with carbon can improve the stability of these layers.

Doping impurities, such as phosphorus or boron, into the nanowire anode can also improve performance by increasing the conductivity.

== Germanium ==
An anode using germanium nanowire was claimed to have the ability to increase the energy density and cycle durability of lithium-ion batteries. Like silicon, germanium has a high theoretical capacity (1600 mAh g-1), expands during charging, and disintegrates after a small number of cycles. However, germanium is 400 times more effective at intercalating lithium than silicon, making it an attractive anode material. The anodes claimed to retain capacities of 900 mAh/g after 1100 cycles, even at discharge rates of 20–100C. This performance was attributed to a restructuring of the nanowires that occurs within the first 100 cycles to form a mechanically robust, continuously porous network. Once formed, the restructured anode loses only 0.01% of capacity per cycle thereafter. The material forms a stable structure after these initial cycles that is capable of withstanding pulverization. In 2014, researchers developed a simple way to produce nanowires of germanium from an aqueous solution.

== Transition metal oxides ==
Transition metal oxides (TMO), such as Cr_{2}O_{3}, Fe_{2}O_{3}, MnO_{2}, Co_{3}O_{4} and PbO_{2}, have many advantages as anode materials over conventional cell materials for lithium-ion battery (LIB) and other battery systems. Some of them possess high theoretical energy capacity, and are naturally abundant, non-toxic and also environmentally friendly. As the concept of the nanostructured battery electrode has been introduced, experimentalists start to look into the possibility of TMO-based nanowires as electrode materials. Some recent investigations into this concept are discussed in the following subsection.

=== Lead oxide anode ===
Lead-acid battery is the oldest type of rechargeable battery cell. Even though the raw material (PbO_{2}) for the cell production is fairly accessible and cheap, lead-acid battery cells have relatively small specific energy. The paste thickening effect (volumetric expansion effect) during the operation cycle also blocks the effective flow of the electrolyte. These problems limited the potential of the cell to accomplish some energy-intensive tasks.

In 2014, experimentalist successfully obtained PbO_{2} nanowire through simple template electrodeposition. The performance of this nanowire as anode for lead-acid battery has also been evaluated. Due to largely increased surface area, this cell was able to deliver an almost constant capacity of about 190 mAh g^{−1} even after 1,000 cycles. This result showed this nanostructured PbO_{2} as a fairly promising substitute for the normal lead-acid anode.

=== Manganese oxide ===
MnO_{2} has always been a good candidate for electrode materials due to its high energy capacity, non-toxicity and cost effectiveness. However, lithium-ion insertion into the crystal matrix during charging/discharging cycle would cause significant volumetric expansion. To counteract this effect during operation cycle, scientists recently proposed the idea of producing a Li-enriched MnO_{2} nanowire with a nominal stoichiometry of Li_{2}MnO_{3} as anode materials for LIB. This new proposed anode materials enable the battery cell to reach an energy capacity of 1279 mAh g^{−1} at current density of 500 mA even after 500 cycles. This performance is much higher than that of pure MnO_{2} anode or MnO_{2} nanowire anode cells.

=== Heterostructure TMOs ===
Heterojunction of different transition metal oxides would sometimes provide the potential of a more well-rounded performance of LIBs.

In 2013, researchers successfully synthesized a branched Co_{3}O_{4}/Fe_{2}O_{3} nanowire heterostructure using hydrothermal method. This heterojunction can be used as an alternative anode for the LIB cell. At operation, Co_{3}O_{4} promotes a more efficient ionic transport, while Fe_{2}O_{3} enhances the theoretical capacity of the cell by increasing the surface area. A high reversible capacity of 980 mAh g^{−1} was reported.

The possibility of fabrication heterogeneous ZnCo_{2}O_{4}/NiO nanowire arrays anode has also been explored in some studies. However, the efficiency of this material as anode is still to be evaluated.

== Gold ==
In 2016, researchers at the University of California, Irvine announced the invention of a nanowire material capable of over 200,000 charge cycles without any breakage of the nanowires. The technology could lead to batteries that never need to be replaced in most applications. The gold nanowires are strengthened by a manganese dioxide shell encased in an Plexiglas-like gel electrolyte. The combination is reliable and resistant to failure. After cycling a test electrode about 200,000 times, no loss of capacity or power, nor fracturing of any nanowires occurred.

== See also ==
- List of battery types
- List of emerging technologies
- Nanoball batteries
