= Nanoball batteries =

Nanoball batteries are an experimental type of battery with either the cathode or anode made of nanosized balls that can be composed of various materials such as carbon and lithium iron phosphate. Batteries which use nanotechnology are more capable than regular batteries because of the vastly improved surface area which allows for greater electrical performance, such as fast charging and discharging.

In 2009, researchers from MIT were able to charge a simple lithium iron phosphate nanoball battery in 10 seconds using this technology. In theory, this would allow for rapid charging of small electronic devices while larger batteries would still be limited by mains electricity.

== Carbon nanoballs ==
=== Construction ===
Before the carbon nanoballs can be made, a carbon rod must be formed. The carbon rod is prepared in the presence of acetylene with coke powder (type of fuel source with few impurities and a high carbon content) and formed using arc discharge technique. Arc discharge technique uses two high-purity graphite electrodes as an anode and a cathode which are vaporized by the passage of a DC (direct current) current. After arc discharging for a period of time, a carbon rod is built up at the cathode. The carbon rod is then put in a DC arc discharge reactor. The carbon rod acts as the anode while a high purity graphite rod acts as the cathode. A current adjusted to 70-90 amps was passed through the two rods in an acetylene medium at a pressure of 0.05 to 0.06 MPa (megapascals). Carbon nanoballs formed on the carbon rod during the arc evaporation process. The carbon nanoballs were then examined using a FE-SEM (Field emission scanning electron microscope) and a STEM (scanning transmission electron microscope) which was equipped with energy dispersive x-rays operated at 200 kV (kilo-volts), x-ray diffraction, and Raman Spectroscopy. Most of the carbon nanoballs that was formed were sintered (solid mass of material formed by heat and/or pressure). Trace amounts of nanoballs that existed as individuals rather than a group was also detected as well as a few cotton-like nano-materials.

=== Results ===
Tests done by the Anhui University of Technology have shown that the carbon nanoballs inside a cell electrode have a high reversible capacity and a capacity retention rate of almost 74%. This means that the battery can discharge very quickly and that the battery has almost three-quarters of its total energy available under the right conditions. Tests done by the Institute of Materials and Technology, Dalian Maritime University have also shown that carbon nanoballs can be used to further increase the energy output of other materials like silicon. Changing the molecular structure of silicon-carbon nanoballs can also result in higher charge and discharge capacities, longer cycling stability (amount of time before needing to replace the battery), and a good rate performance.

== Lithium iron phosphate nanoballs ==
=== Construction of lithium iron phosphate nanoballs ===
Like carbon, lithium is also a good energy conductor. It is also already in use in commercial lithium-ion batteries. Lithium makes a good energy conductor because it allows ions to transfer faster than other elements and is also able to hold on to that energy longer. Research has shown that coating a phosphate particle with a layer of LiFePO_{4} (lithium iron phosphate) allows for an even faster rate of ion transferral. Lithium iron phosphate was made by solid-state reaction using Li_{2}CO_{3} (lithium carbonate), FeC_{2}O_{4} (iron(II) oxalate), and NH_{4}H_{2}PO_{4} (ammonium dihydrogen phosphate). The compounds were then placed in acetone and ball-milled (grinding materials together in a special cylindrical device) before being heated at 350 °C for 10 hours and then being allowed to cool to room temperature The mixture was then pelletized under 10,000 pounds of pressure before being heated again at 600 °C for 10 hours under argon. Each nanoball created measured around 50 nm(nanometers) in diameter. Under normal circumstances, electrochemical systems (e.g., batteries) can only achieve high power rates with supercapacitors. Supercapacitors achieve a high power rate by storing energy through surface adsorption reactions of charged species on an electrode. However, this results in low energy density. Instead of just storing charge on the surface of a material, Lithium iron phosphate can achieve a high power rate and high energy density by storing charge in the bulk of itself (the interior of the carbon nanoballs). This is possible because lithium iron phosphate has high lithium bulk mobility. Creating a fast ion-conducting surface phase through controlled off-stoichiometry (controlling the mole to mole ratio of the reactants and products in the molecular equation) enabled an ultrafast discharge rate.

=== Results ===
Discharge rate tests were conducted on electrodes with 30% active material, 65% carbon, and 5% binder. The lithium iron phosphate nanoballs were assembled in an argon-filled glove box and tested using a Maccor 2200 (type of battery test system). The Maccor 2000 was set to galvanostatic mode(measures electrochemical performance) and used lithium metal as an anode and a non-aqueous electrolyte and Celgard 2600 or 2500 as a separator. The final discharge rate was fast enough to charge a battery in about 10–20 seconds, about a 100x faster than a normal battery.

== Commercial uses ==
Since this is an experimental procedure done in a lab environment, there haven't been any commercial products that have implemented this type of technology yet. Tesla Motors has thought about implementing nanoball batteries into its vehicles but the amount of energy needed and the cable needed to transfer that much energy would make it highly inefficient. As of right now, nanoball batteries are still in the experimental stage. Besides being used in cars and phones, nanoball batteries could also be used for relief in third-world countries and disaster-stricken areas as their small size and high discharge rates would allow for energy to be quickly and efficiently spread around.

== Future ==
Nanoball batteries show a lot of potential but improvements have to be made before they become a viable option to replace current batteries. Future research would include trying to integrate the nanoballs into the cathode of a lithium cell or merging nanoballs with other materials like silicon in batteries. Research done at the School of Material Science and Engineering at East China University of Science and Technology has shown that coating silicon nanoballs with a graphene/carbon coating keeps the silicon nanoball from degrading too quickly and improving the overall electromechanical performance of the battery. For commercial use in cars and other electrical vehicles, the nanoball battery would need to be able to charge the vehicle using less energy. Even though the battery can discharge very quickly, too much energy is needed to go into the battery. Another issue that needs correcting is that even though the battery can discharge very quickly, it has difficulty holding on to that much energy for very long. Increasing the limit of how much energy the battery could hold would make the battery much more efficient. The technology may also allow for smaller batteries as the cathode material degrades at a slower rate than in current production batteries.

== See also ==
- List of battery types
- Nanowire battery
