= Students for Bhopal =

Student activist organization network

- Type: Non-profit, Interest group
- Location: Global, office at San Francisco
- Services: Direct action, appeal campaigns, media attention, research
- Key people: Shana Ortman, Aquene Freechild, Claire Rosenfeld, Pragya Bhagat, Tony Millard, Diana Katgara, Daniel Yeow
- Website: http://www.studentsforbhopal.org

Students for Bhopal (SfB) is an international network of students and supporters working in solidarity with the survivors of the Bhopal disaster – the world's worst-ever industrial catastrophe - in their struggle for justice. Through education, grassroots organizing and non-violent direct action, SfB builds pressure against Dow Chemical and the Indian Government to uphold the Bhopalis' demand for justice, and their fundamental human right to live free of chemical poison. It was coordinated by Ryan Bodanyi, who founded the organization in 2003.

== Relationship with survivors ==
Students for Bhopal is guided by the demands, campaigns and vision of the survivors themselves. SfB was founded as the "student wing" of the International Campaign for Justice in Bhopal (ICJB), an international coalition of organizations and institutions dedicated to supporting the campaign of the Bhopal survivors. Four grassroots Bhopali organizations form the core of ICJB - Bhopal Gas Peedit Mahila Stationery Karmchari Sangh, Bhopal Gas Peedit Mahila Purush Sangharsh Morcha, Bhopal Group for Information and Action and Bhopal ki Awaaz – and provide the guidance and inspiration for its work around the globe, including the work of Students for Bhopal.

== Campaigns ==
Students for Bhopal volunteers work within their own institutions and communities to build pressure on against Dow Chemical and the Indian Government to meet the demands of the Bhopali survivors. These campaigns can take a variety of forms, but often start with education and awareness-raising efforts. These not only lay the groundwork for future campaigns, but also create new advocates and volunteers as well.

Students have advocated for universities and colleges which own stock in Dow Chemical to either divest from the company, or support a shareholder resolution which requests that Dow report on the threat its inaction may pose to the company. Some universities and colleges do not hold stock in Dow Chemical, but do accept funding from them. In such cases Students for Bhopal chapters have demanded that their schools should reject funding from Dow until the corporation resolves its outstanding liabilities in Bhopal.

Many universities and colleges also serve as recruiting grounds for Dow Chemical. Students for Bhopal volunteers have instead worked to educate their fellow students about Dow's legacy of contamination and environmental damage, urging them to sign a pledge not to work for Dow until it addresses its outstanding responsibilities in Bhopal.

Students for Bhopal has also worked to engage Dow's Board of Directors. As Dow's ultimate decision-making authority, SfB volunteers have continued to ask Dow's Board members to take responsibility for Bhopal through letter writing campaigns, fax and email actions, phone calls, personal visits and protests.

The Government of India has also been a target of the survivors’ demands, and Students for Bhopal members have echoed survivors' requests for safe drinking water, social and economic support, good healthcare, and more through email, fax and phone actions, and protests outside of Indian offices, consulates and embassies.

Students for Bhopal members have also passed city council resolutions in their communities, most notably in San Francisco, Seattle, and Cambridge, Massachusetts.

== Actions ==
Students for Bhopal members have launched campaigns and conducted numerous actions worldwide in support of actions and campaigns launched by Bhopali gas-disaster survivors.

=== No Objection Certificate ===
In 2004, the United States Court of Appeals for the Second Circuit ruled that Union Carbide could be held accountable for a comprehensive cleanup in Bhopal, but that the permission of the Government of India was needed before the court could order any remediation. The government was reluctant to submit the No Objection Certificate (NOC) to the Court, so Students for Bhopal and the Association for India's Development coordinated numerous actions as the 30 June deadline approached. These included faxes, emails and telephone calls of support, protests in front of Indian Consulates in Houston, Washington DC and New York, and a six-day hunger strike by Bhopal survivors.

=== Distribution of compensation ===
Because the $470 million settlement received from Union Carbide was distributed over a 15-year period, more than $330 million in interest accrued by the time the settlement was distributed. On 24 February 2004 Students for Bhopal and the Association for India's Development launched an International Day of Action to pressure the Indian Government into distributing the interest to the survivors rather than using it for other purposes. Indian Consulates in the U.S. were targeted with emails and calls. Students in Canada wrote letters to the High Commission of India in Canada. Fifteen students met with the Governor of Madhya Pradesh and presented him with a petition demanding distribution of the earned interest, while students in New Delhi met with the Indian President to present the demands and ask for his support.

=== Clean water ===
Because the disaster contaminate water supplies 20,00 nearby residents need a permanent piped water supply. This has not yet been implemented and Students for Bhopal continues to advocate for a permanent piped supply of drinking water.

=== Stopping Dow in India ===
We Feel Responsible, a major chapter of Students for Bhopal, lead a rally in Chennai as part of a larger movement by Bhopal survivors to demand the blacklisting of Dow by the Government and protest the Indian Oil Corporation's plans to do business with a corporation that had outstanding liabilities in Bhopal.

=== March to Delhi ===
As a part of their ongoing efforts to get justice, Bhopal Gas Tragedy survivors along with volunteers from Students For Bhopal and other organizations are taking part in a 500 miles walk from Bhopal to New Delhi starting 20 February 2008. They are hoping to meet the Prime Minister of India and demand the setting up of a Special Commission which would monitor and provide medical care, rehabilitation to the victims of the gas leak, environmental cleanup and ensure safe drinking water for the city. Furthermore, the activists are also demanding that the Ministry of Chemicals file for claims against Dow Chemical in MP high court with regards to the toxic cleanup of the affected area, the Govt. of India move for extradition of Warren Anderson (the CEO of Union Carbide at the time of the disaster), revoke approval given to Reliance for purchase of Union Carbide's Unipol technology which is intellectual property that should be confiscated because the corporation is absconding since 1992 and cancel the registration of pesticides, including Dursban, obtained by bribing Agriculture Ministry officials as established by Securities & Exchange Commission, USA.
