= Rosalie Bertell =

Canadian-American nun, physician, author, researcher and epidemiologist

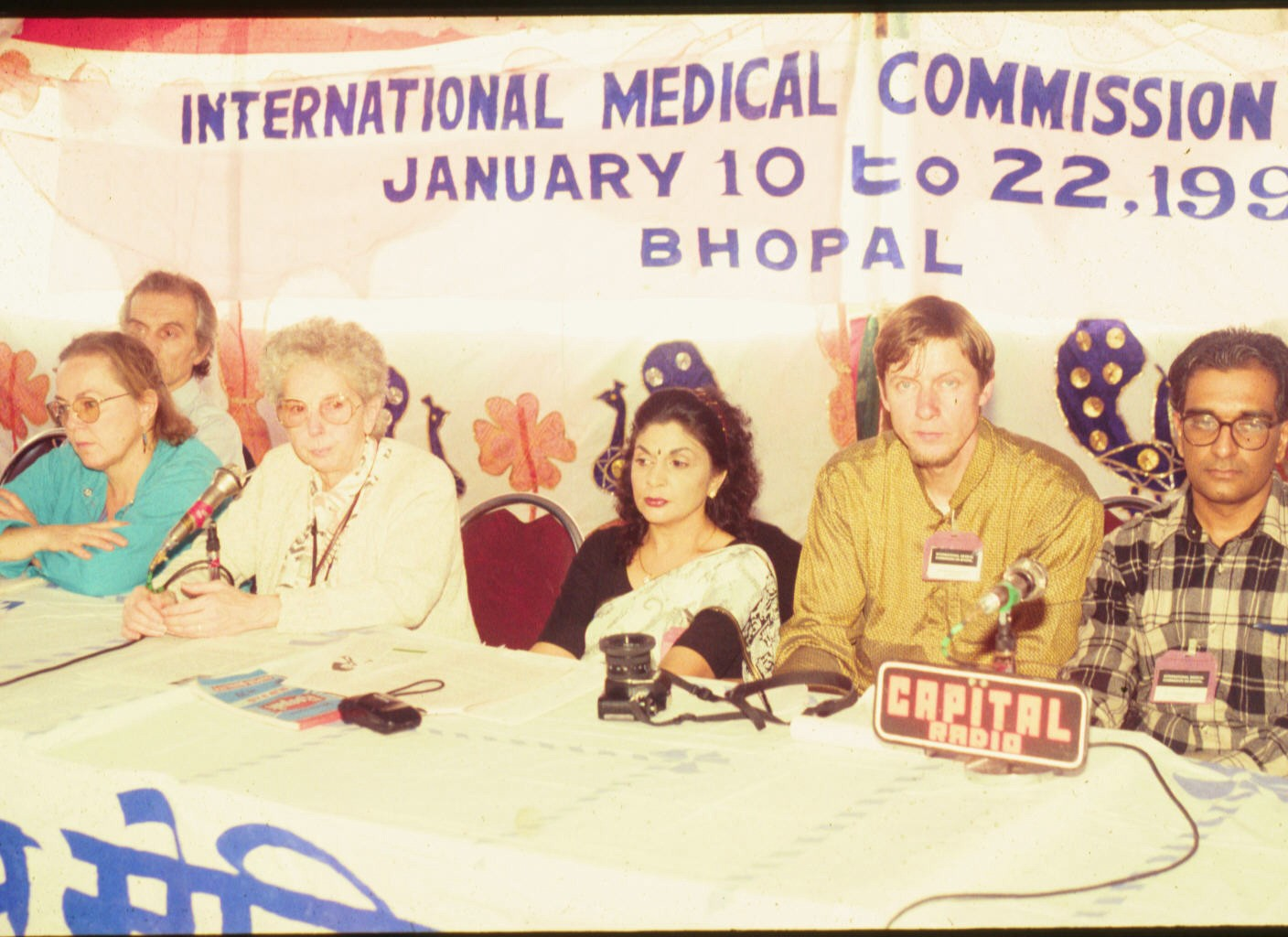
Rosalie Bertell (third from left) at the International Medical Commission of Bhopal

Rosalie Bertell (April 4, 1929 – June 14, 2012) was a Canadian-American scientist, author, environmental activist, epidemiologist, and Catholic nun. Bertell was a sister of the Grey Nuns of the Sacred Heart, best known for her work in the field of ionizing radiation. A dual citizen of Canada and the United States, she worked in environmental health since 1970.

She wrote the book "No Immediate Danger", describing the dangers of radiation from the nuclear industry. Rosalie won many awards, including the Right Livelihood Award in 1986, for "raising public awareness about the destruction of the biosphere and human gene pool, especially by low-level radiation." She died of cancer in 2012.

== Biography ==
Rosalie Bertell was born to Paul G. and Helen (née Twohey) Bertell in Buffalo, New York, the third of four children. Her mother was Canadian and her father was American. She had an older sister, Mary Katherine Bertell (1925–2011), and a younger brother, John Twohey Bertell (1930–2002). A third sibling, Paul W. Bertell died in infancy in 1921. She received her BA in Math/Physics/Education from D'Youville College, and later was an associate professor of mathematics at D'Youville from 1969 to 1973.

From 1969 to 1978, Bertell was senior cancer research scientist at Roswell Park Comprehensive Cancer Center. She was a consultant to the US Nuclear Regulatory Commission, the US Environmental Protection Agency, and to Health Canada. In 1983, she received the "Hans-Adalbert Schweigart"-Medal from the World Union for Protection of Life. She wrote the books No Immediate Danger: Prognosis for a Radioactive Earth (1985) and Planet Earth: The Latest Weapon of War (2000).

Bertell was a coordinator for the International Medical Commission on Bhopal, and campaigned for an independent body "to coordinate health care, research and rehabilitation" for victims of the Bhopal disaster. Bertell's Nuclear Contamination Act was adopted April 2006, as World Legislative Act 35 by the 9th session of the Provisional World Parliament. She suffered attempts on her life, and attacks on her scientific credentials.

In 2012, Bertell died of cancer at age 83 at Saint Mary Medical Center, Langhorne, Pennsylvania, United States.

== Awards ==
Bertell received many awards, including:

- Hans-Adalbert-Schweigart-Medal (1983)
- Right Livelihood Award (1986)
- World Federalist Peace Award
- Ontario Premier's Council on Health, Health Innovator Award (1991)
- United Nations Environment Programme Global 500 award
- Seán MacBride International Peace Prize

== Filmography ==
Nuclear Addiction: Dr. Rosalie Bertell on the Cost of Deterrence is a 1986 documentary directed by Academy Award winner Terre Nash and produced by Studio D of the National Film Board of Canada. Additionally, Bertell appeared in at least five other documentary films between 1985 and 2005. They include:

Title	Director	Production company	Year
Speaking our peace	Bonnie Sherr Klein, Terre Nash	National Film Board of Canada Studio D	1985
Uranium	Magnus Isacsson	National Film Board of Canada	1990
Bhopal: The Search for Justice	Peter Raymont, Lindalee Tracey	White Pine Pictures	2004
Fatal Fallout: The Bush Legacy	Gary Null		2004
Poison Dust	Sue Harris	Lightyear Entertainment	2005

== See also ==
- Irradiation
- Chemtrail conspiracy theory
- Alice Stewart
- Helen Caldicott
