= Bhopal disaster =

1984 gas-leak accident in Bhopal, India

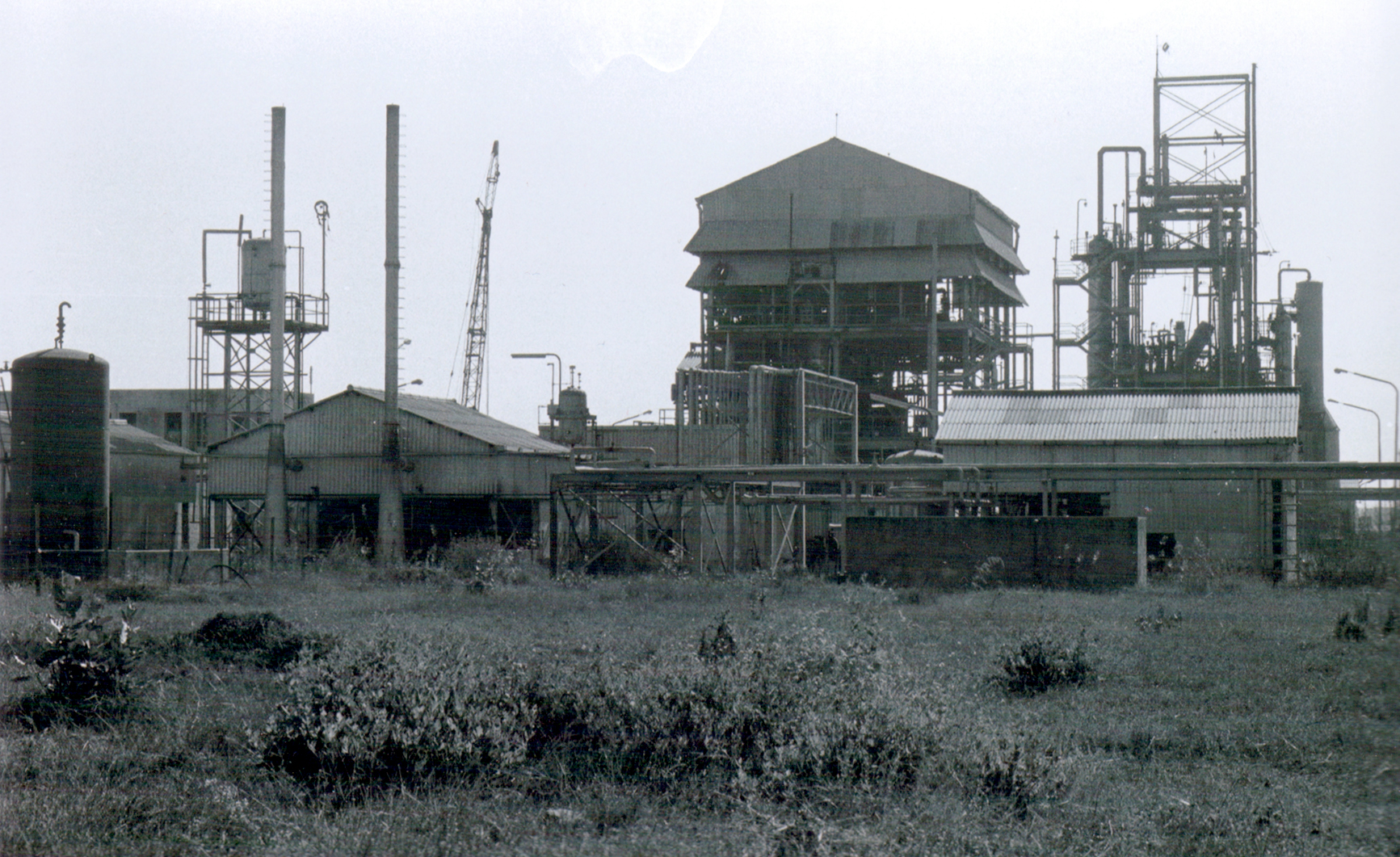
- The Bhopal pesticide plant of Union Carbide India Limited in 1985, a year after the disaster

- Location within India Location within Bhopal
- Date: 2–3 December 1984
- Location: Bhopal, Madhya Pradesh, India; 23.2799°N 77.4099°E
- Also known as: Bhopal gas tragedy
- Type: Chemical accident
- Cause: Methyl isocyanate leak from the E610 storage tank on the Union Carbide India Limited plant
- Deaths: At least 3,787; over 16,000 claimed
- Injuries: At least 558,125

On 3 December 1984, over 500,000 people in the vicinity of the Union Carbide India Limited pesticide plant in Bhopal, Madhya Pradesh, India, were exposed to the highly toxic gas methyl isocyanate, in what is considered the world's worst industrial disaster, as well as the largest chemical disaster in Indian history. A government affidavit in 2006 stated that the leak caused approximately 558,125 injuries, including 38,478 temporary partial injuries and 3,900 severely and permanently disabling injuries. Estimates vary on the death toll, with the official number of immediate deaths being 2,259. Others estimate that 8,000 or more died from gas-related diseases. In 1989, Union Carbide Corporation (UCC) of the United States paid $470 million (equivalent to $1.06 billion in 2025) to settle litigation stemming from the disaster.

The owner of the factory, Union Carbide India Limited (UCIL), was a publicly-traded company which was majority-owned and controlled by the UCC, while the remaining 49.1 percent stake was held by the Indian public and Indian government-controlled banks. In 1994, UCC sold its stake in UCIL to Eveready Industries India Limited (EIIL), which subsequently merged with McLeod Russel (India) Ltd. Eveready ended clean-up on the site in 1998, when it terminated its 99-year lease and turned over control of the site to the state government of Madhya Pradesh. Dow Chemical Company purchased UCC in 2001, seventeen years after the disaster.

Civil and criminal cases filed in the United States against UCC and Warren Anderson, chief executive officer of the UCC at the time of the disaster, were dismissed and redirected to Indian courts on multiple occasions between 1986 and 2012, as the US courts focused on UCIL being a standalone entity of India. Civil and criminal cases were also filed in the District Court of Bhopal, India, involving UCC, UCIL, and Anderson. In June 2010, seven Indian nationals who were UCIL employees in 1984, including the former UCIL chairman Keshub Mahindra, were convicted in Bhopal of causing death by negligence and sentenced to two years' imprisonment and a fine of about $2,000 each, the maximum punishment allowed by Indian law. All were released on bail shortly after the verdict. An eighth former employee was also convicted, but died before the judgement was passed.

== Background ==
Methylamine (1) reacts with phosgene (2) to produce methyl isocyanate (3), which in turn reacts with 1-naphthol (4) to yield carbaryl (5).

The UCIL factory was built in 1969 to produce the pesticide Sevin (UCC's brand name for carbaryl) using methyl isocyanate (MIC) as an intermediate. An MIC production plant was added to the UCIL site in 1979. The chemical process employed in the Bhopal plant had methylamine reacting with phosgene to form MIC, which was in turn reacted with 1-naphthol to form the final product, carbaryl. Another manufacturer, Bayer, also used this MIC-intermediate process at the chemical plant once owned by UCC at Institute, West Virginia in the United States.

After the Bhopal plant was built, other manufacturers (including Bayer) produced carbaryl without MIC, though at a greater manufacturing cost. UCIL's process differed from the MIC-free routes used elsewhere, in which the same raw materials were combined in a different manufacturing order, with phosgene initially reacting with 1-naphthol to form a chloroformate ester, which was later reacted with methylamine. In the early 1980s, although the demand for pesticides had fallen, production continued leading to an accumulation of unused MIC at the Bhopal site.

=== Earlier leaks ===
In 1976, two local trade unions complained of pollution within the plant. In 1981, a worker was accidentally splashed with phosgene as he was carrying out a maintenance job of the plant's pipes. In a panic, he removed his gas mask and inhaled a large amount of toxic phosgene gas, leading to his death 72 hours later. Following these events, journalist Rajkumar Keswani began investigating and published his findings in Bhopal's local paper Rapat, in which he urged "Wake up, people of Bhopal, you are on the edge of a volcano."

In January 1982, a phosgene leak exposed 24 workers, all of whom were admitted to a hospital. None of the workers had been ordered to wear protective equipment. One month later in February 1982, an MIC leak affected 18 workers. In August 1982, a chemical engineer came into contact with liquid MIC, resulting in burns over 30% of his body. In October 1982, there was another MIC leak. In attempting to stop the leak, the MIC supervisor suffered severe chemical burns and two other workers were severely exposed to the gases. During 1983 and 1984, there were leaks of MIC, chlorine, monomethylamine, phosgene, and carbon tetrachloride, sometimes in combination.

== Leakage and its effects ==
=== Liquid MIC storage ===
The Bhopal UCIL facility housed three underground 68,000-litre (18,000-US-gallon) liquid MIC storage tanks: E610, E611, and E619. In the months leading up to the December leak, liquid MIC production was in progress and being used to fill these tanks. UCC safety regulations specified that no one tank should be filled more than 50% (about 30 tons) with liquid MIC. Each tank was pressurized with inert nitrogen gas. This pressurization allowed liquid MIC to be pumped out of each tank as needed and also kept impurities and moisture out of the tanks.

In late October 1984, tank E610 lost the ability to effectively contain most of its nitrogen gas pressure, which meant that the liquid MIC contained within could not be pumped out. At the time of this failure, tank E610 contained 42 tons of liquid MIC. Shortly after this failure, MIC production was halted at the Bhopal facility, and parts of the plant were shut down for maintenance. Maintenance included the shutdown of the plant's flare tower so that a corroded pipe could be repaired. With the flare tower still inoperable, production of carbaryl was resumed in late November using MIC stored in the two tanks still in service. An attempt to re-establish pressure in tank E610 on 1 December failed, so the 42 tons of liquid MIC contained within still could not be pumped out of it.

=== Gas leak ===
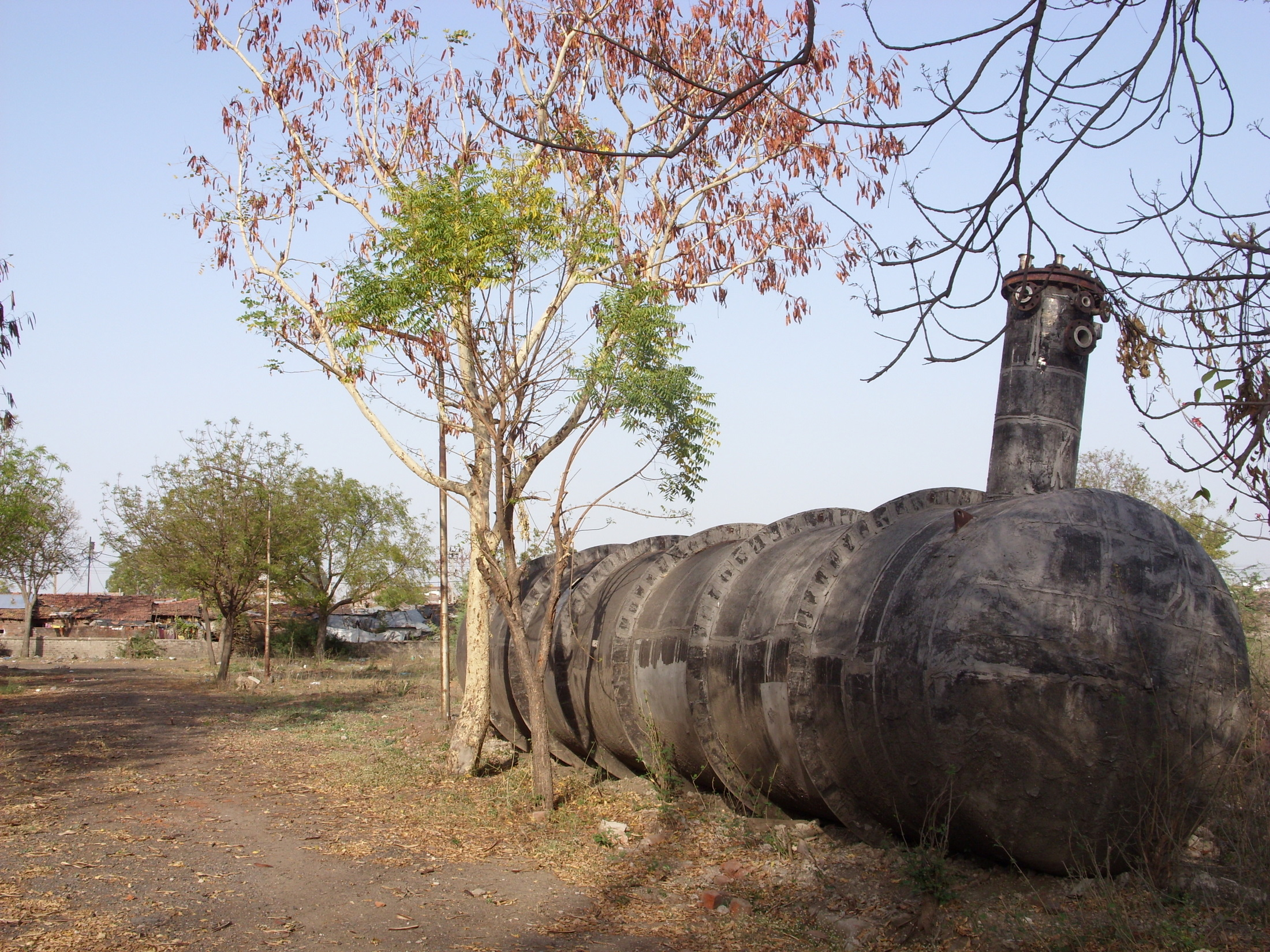
Tank E610 in 2010. During the decontamination of the plant, the tank was removed from its foundations and set aside.

By early December 1984, most of the plant's MIC related safety systems were malfunctioning and many valves and lines were in poor condition. In addition, several vent gas scrubbers had been out of service, as well as the steam boiler intended to clean the pipes. During the late evening hours of 2 December 1984, water was believed to have entered tank E610 via a side pipe during attempts to unclog it. The tank still contained the 42 tons of MIC that had been there since late October. The introduction of water into the tank resulted in a runaway exothermic reaction, which was accelerated by contaminants, high ambient temperatures, and various other factors such as the presence of iron from corroding non-stainless steel pipelines. The pressure in tank E610, although initially nominal at 14 kilopascals (2 psi) at 10:30 p.m., reached 70 kilopascals (10 psi) as of 11 p.m. Two different senior refinery employees assumed the reading was instrumentation malfunction. By 11:30 p.m., workers in the MIC area were feeling the effects of minor exposure to MIC gas and began to look for a leak. One was found by 11:45 p.m. and reported to the MIC supervisor on duty at the time. The decision was made to address the problem after a 12:15 a.m. tea break, and in the meantime, employees were instructed to continue looking for leaks. The problem was discussed by MIC area employees during the break.

When the tea break concluded at 12:40 a.m., the reaction in tank E610 escalated to a critical state at a rapid speed within five minutes. Temperatures in the tank were off the scale beyond 25 °C (77 °F), and the pressure in the tank was indicated at 280 kilopascals (40 psi). One employee witnessed a concrete slab above tank E610 crack as the emergency relief valve burst open, and pressure in the tank continued to increase to 380 kilopascals (55 psi), despite atmospheric venting of toxic MIC gas having begun. Direct atmospheric venting should have been prevented or at least partially mitigated by at least three safety devices which were malfunctioning, not in use, insufficiently sized, or otherwise rendered inoperable:

- A refrigeration system meant to cool tanks containing liquid MIC had been shut down in January 1982 and the freon had been removed in June 1984. Since the MIC storage system assumed refrigeration, its high temperature alarm, set to sound at 11 °C (52 °F) had long since been disconnected, and tank storage temperatures ranged between 15 °C (59 °F) and 40 °C (104 °F)
- A flare tower to burn the MIC gas as it escaped, which had had a connecting pipe removed for maintenance, was improperly sized to neutralise a leak of the size produced by tank E610.
- A vent gas scrubber which had been deactivated at the time and was in 'standby' mode, and similarly had insufficient caustic soda and power to safely stop a leak of the magnitude produced.

About 30 tonnes of MIC escaped from the tank into the atmosphere in 45 to 60 minutes. This would increase to 40 tonnes within two hours. The gases were blown in a southeast direction over Bhopal.

A UCIL employee triggered the plant's alarm system at 12:50 a.m. as the concentration of gas in and around the plant became difficult to tolerate. Activation of the system triggered two siren alarms: one that specifically sounded inside the UCIL plant itself and a second directed to the exterior which would alert the general public and the city of Bhopal. The two siren systems had been decoupled from one another in 1982, so that it was possible to leave the factory warning siren on while the public one remained inactive. This is what had occurred; the public siren briefly sounded at 12:50 a.m. and was quickly turned off, as per company procedure meant to avoid alarming the public around the factory over inconsequential leaks. Workers, meanwhile, evacuated the UCIL plant, travelling upwind.

Bhopal's superintendent of police was informed via telephone by a town inspector that residents of the neighbourhood of Chola (about 2 km from the plant) were fleeing a gas leak at approximately 1 a.m. Calls to the UCIL plant by police between 1:25 and 2:10 a.m. elicited assurances twice that "everything is OK", and on the last attempt made, "we don't know what has happened, sir". With the lack of timely information exchange between UCIL and Bhopal authorities, the city's Hamidia Hospital was first told that the gas leak was suspected to be ammonia, then later phosgene. Finally, they received an updated report that it was "MIC" (rather than "methyl isocyanate"), which hospital staff had never heard of, had no antidote for, and knew no immediate information about.

The MIC gas leak from tank E610 stopped at approximately 2 a.m. Fifteen minutes later, the plant's public siren was sounded for an extended period of time after having been quickly silenced an hour and a half earlier. Some minutes after the public siren sounded, a UCIL employee walked to a police control room to both inform them of the leak (their first acknowledgement that one had ever occurred in the first place), and said that the leak had been plugged. Most city residents who were exposed to the MIC gas were first made aware of the leak by exposure to the gas itself, or by opening their doors to investigate commotion, rather than having been instructed to shelter in place or to evacuate before the arrival of the gas in the first place.

=== Acute effects ===
The reversible reaction of glutathione (top) with MIC (middle) allows MIC to be transported into the body.

The initial effects of exposure were coughing, severe eye irritation, a feeling of suffocation, burning in the respiratory tract, blepharospasm, breathlessness, stomach pains, and vomiting. People alerted by these symptoms fled from the plant. Those who ran inhaled more than those in vehicles. Owing to their height, children and other residents of shorter stature inhaled higher concentrations, as methyl isocyanate gas is approximately twice as dense as air and in an open environment has a tendency to fall toward the ground.

Thousands of people had died by the following morning. Primary causes of deaths were choking, reflexogenic circulatory collapse, and pulmonary oedema. Findings during autopsies revealed changes not only in the lungs but also cerebral oedema, tubular necrosis of the kidneys, fatty degeneration of the liver, and necrotising enteritis. The individuals who did not die suffered from cancer, blindness, loss of livelihood, and financial strain.

=== Gas cloud composition ===
Apart from MIC, based on laboratory simulation conditions, the gas cloud most likely also contained chloroform, dichloromethane, hydrogen chloride, methylamine, dimethylamine, trimethylamine, and carbon dioxide that was either present in the tank or was produced in the storage tank when MIC, chloroform, and water reacted. The gas cloud, composed mainly of materials denser than air, stayed close to the ground and spread in a southeast direction affecting the nearby communities. The chemical reactions may have produced a liquid or solid aerosol. Laboratory investigations by CSIR and UCC scientists failed to demonstrate the presence of hydrogen cyanide.

=== Immediate aftermath ===
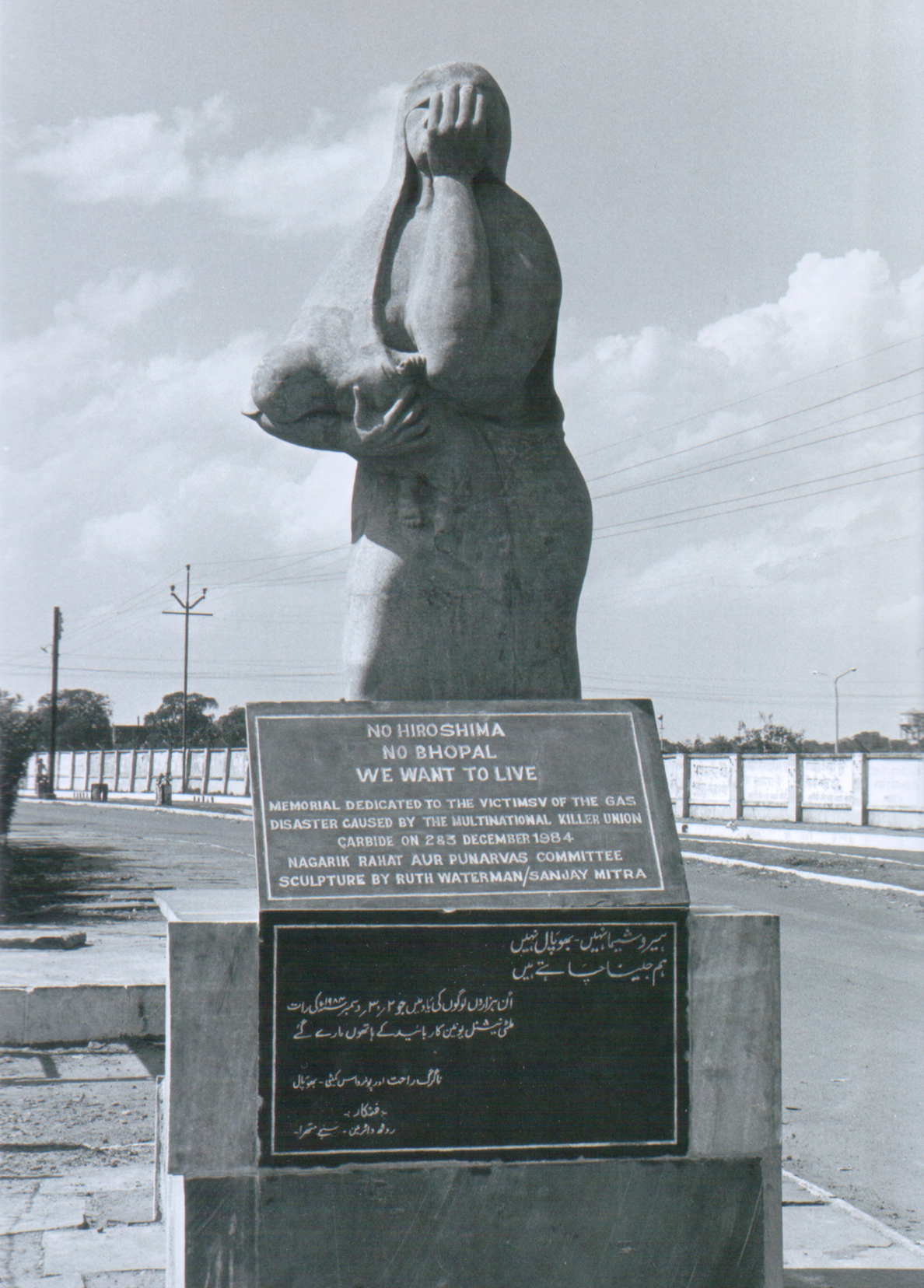
Memorial to those killed and disabled in Bhopal by Dutch Holocaust survivor Ruth Waterman-Kupferschmidt

In the immediate aftermath, the plant was closed to outsiders (including UCC) by the Indian government, which subsequently failed to make data public, contributing to the confusion. The initial investigation was conducted entirely by the Council of Scientific and Industrial Research (CSIR) and the Central Bureau of Investigation. The UCC chairman and CEO Warren Anderson, together with a technical team, immediately travelled to India. Upon arrival, Anderson was placed under house arrest and urged by the Indian government to leave the country within 24 hours. Union Carbide organized a team of international medical experts, as well as supplies and equipment, to work with the local Bhopal medical community, and the UCC technical team began assessing the cause of the gas leak.

The health care system were quickly overwhelmed. In the severely affected areas, nearly 70% of doctors were underqualified. Medical staff were unprepared for the thousands of casualties. Doctors and hospitals were not aware of proper treatment methods for MIC gas inhalation.

There were mass funerals and cremations. Photographer Pablo Bartholomew, on commission with press agency Rapho, took an iconic colour photograph of a burial on 4 December, Bhopal gas disaster girl. Another photographer present, Raghu Rai, took a black and white photo. The photographers did not ask for the identity of the father or child as she was buried and no relative has since confirmed it. As such, the identity of the girl remains unknown. Both photos became symbolic of the suffering of victims of the Bhopal disaster, and Bartholomew went on to win the 1985 World Press Photo of the Year.

Within a few days, trees in the vicinity became barren, and bloated animal carcasses had to be disposed of. About 170,000 people were treated at hospitals and temporary dispensaries, and 2,000 buffalo, goats, and other animals were collected and buried. Supplies, including food, became scarce owing to suppliers' safety fears. Fishing was prohibited, causing further supply shortages.

Lacking any safe alternative, on 16 December, tanks 611 and 619 were emptied of the remaining MIC by reactivating the plant and continuing the manufacture of pesticide. Despite safety precautions such as having water-carrying helicopters continually overflying the plant, this led to a second mass evacuation from Bhopal.

In March 1985, the Government of India passed the "Bhopal Gas Leak Disaster Act" that gave the Indian government rights to represent all victims, whether or not in India. Complaints of lack of information or misinformation were widespread. An Indian government spokesman said, "Carbide is more interested in getting information from us than in helping our relief work".

Formal statements were issued that air, water, vegetation, and foodstuffs were safe, but people were warned not to consume fish. The number of children exposed to the gases was at least 200,000. Within weeks, the State Government established a number of hospitals, clinics, and mobile units in the gas-affected area to treat the victims. S. Ravi Rajan (Prof. Environmental Studies, U.C. Santa Cruz) outlines the financially driven undertones of the company's actions. UCC had participated in decades of previous instances of "environmental negligence in every part of the world", directing its "responsibility… to its shareholders", and numerous dealings with local and international political and economic powers. The company's response to the Bhopal accident was what Rajan describes as a "campaign of erasure", meaning the transfer of liability and responsibility of the cause of the gas leak, the event itself, and the aftermath. Rajan then argues that this type of response is to be expected "according to [the] established cultural practice" within large corporations such as UCC. Since UCC absolved itself from the situation, the Indian government was the next institution that was looked to by the people of Bhopal, but they had also not prepared for such an event. The government's attempts at short and long-term plans failed in successfully aiding victims and instead "created an ecology of opportunity… built largely at the expense of the victims."

== Subsequent legal action ==
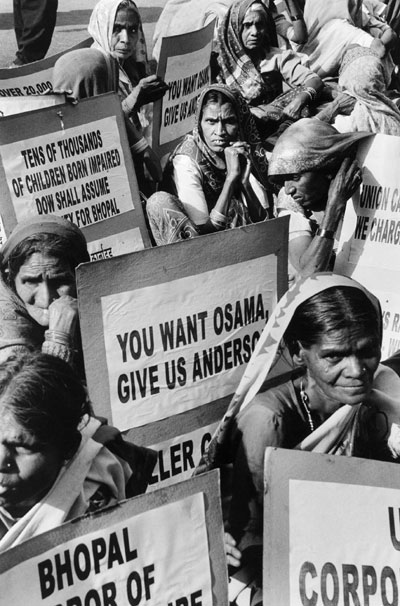
Victims of the Bhopal disaster march in September 2006, demanding the extradition of Warren Anderson from the United States.

Legal proceedings involving UCC, the United States and Indian governments, local Bhopal authorities, and the disaster victims started immediately after the catastrophe. The Indian Government passed the Bhopal Gas Leak Act in March 1985, allowing the Government of India to act as the legal representative for victims of the disaster, leading to the beginning of legal proceedings. Initial lawsuits were generated in the United States federal court system. On 17 April 1985, Federal District court judge John F. Keenan (overseeing one lawsuit) suggested that "'fundamental human decency' required Union Carbide to provide between $5 million and $10 million to immediately help the injured" and suggested the money could be quickly distributed through the International Red Cross. UCC, on the notion that doing so did not constitute an admission of liability and the figure could be credited toward any future settlement or judgement, offered a $5 million relief fund two days later. The Indian government turned down the offer.

In March 1986, UCC proposed a settlement figure, endorsed by plaintiffs' U.S. attorneys, of $350 million that would, according to the company, "generate a fund for Bhopal victims of between $500–600 million over 20 years". In May, litigation was transferred from the United States to Indian courts by a U.S. District Court ruling. Following an appeal of this decision, the U.S. Court of Appeals affirmed the transfer in November 1986, judging that UCIL was a "a separate and independent legal entity, managed and operated exclusively by Indian citizens in India".

The Government of India refused the offer from Union Carbide, and claimed US$3.3 billion. The Indian Supreme Court told both sides to come to an agreement and "start with a clean slate" in November 1988. Eventually, in an out-of-court settlement reached in February 1989, Union Carbide agreed to pay US$470 million for damages caused in the Bhopal disaster. The amount was immediately paid.

Throughout 1990, the Indian Supreme Court heard appeals against the settlement. In October 1991, the Court upheld the original $470 million, dismissing any other outstanding petitions that challenged the original decision. It ordered the Indian government "to purchase, out of settlement fund, a group medical insurance policy to cover 100,000 persons who may later develop symptoms" and cover any shortfall in the settlement fund. It also requested UCC and its subsidiary UCIL "voluntarily" fund a hospital in Bhopal, at an estimated $17 million, to specifically treat victims of the Bhopal disaster. The company agreed to this.

=== Post-settlement activity ===
In 1991, the local Bhopal authorities charged Anderson, who had retired in 1986, with manslaughter, a crime that carries a maximum penalty of 10 years in prison. He was declared a fugitive from justice by the Chief Judicial Magistrate of Bhopal on 1 February 1992 for failing to appear at the court hearings in a culpable homicide case in which he was named the chief defendant. Orders were passed to the Government of India to press for an extradition from the United States. The United States declined to extradite him citing a lack of evidence.

The U.S. Supreme Court refused to hear an appeal of the decision of the lower federal courts in October 1993 against allowing victims of the Bhopal disaster to seek damages in a U.S. court.

In 2004, the Indian Supreme Court ordered the Indian government to release any remaining settlement funds to victims. And in September 2006, the Welfare Commission for Bhopal Gas Victims announced that all original compensation claims and revised petitions had been "cleared".

In 2006, the U.S. Court of Appeals for the Second Circuit in New York City upheld the dismissal of remaining claims in the case of Bano v. Union Carbide Corporation. This move blocked plaintiffs' motions for class certification and claims for property damages and remediation. In the view of UCC, "the ruling reaffirms UCC's long-held positions and finally puts to rest—both procedurally and substantively—the issues raised in the class action complaint first filed against Union Carbide in 1999 by Haseena Bi and several organisations representing the residents of Bhopal".

In June 2010, seven former employees of UCIL, all Indian nationals and many in their 70s, were convicted of causing death by negligence: Keshub Mahindra, former non-executive chairman of Union Carbide India Limited; V. P. Gokhale, managing director; Kishore Kamdar, vice-president; J. Mukund, works manager; S. P. Choudhary, production manager; K. V. Shetty, plant superintendent; and S. I. Qureshi, production assistant. They were each sentenced to two years' imprisonment and fined ₹100,000 (equivalent to ₹240,000 or US$2,600 in 2026). All were released on bail shortly after the verdict.

A US federal class action litigation, Sahu v. Union Carbide and Warren Anderson, was filed in 1999 under the U.S. Alien Torts Claims Act (ATCA), which provides for civil remedies for "crimes against humanity". It sought damages for personal injury, medical monitoring and injunctive relief in the form of clean-up of the drinking water supplies for residential areas near the Bhopal plant. The lawsuit was dismissed in 2012 and the subsequent appeal was denied.

Warren Anderson, then 92 years old, died on 29 September 2014.

On 14 March 2023, Indian Supreme Court dismissed curative petition for enhanced compensation.

== Long-term effects ==
In 2018, The Atlantic called it the "world's worst industrial disaster". Lawyers, academics and journalists have described the disaster as an ecocide.

=== Long-term health effects ===
Some data about the health effects are still not available. The Indian Council of Medical Research (ICMR) was forbidden to publish health effect data until 1994.

A total of 36 wards were marked by the authorities as being "gas affected", affecting a population of 520,000. Of these, 200,000 were below 15 years of age, and 3,000 were pregnant women. The official immediate death toll was 2,259, and in 1991, 3,928 deaths had been officially certified. The Sambhavna clinic "estimates 8,000 deaths during the first weeks, and another 8,000 since then".

The government of Madhya Pradesh confirmed a total of 3,787 deaths related to the gas release.

Later, the affected area was expanded to include 700,000 citizens. A government affidavit in 2006 stated the leak caused 558,125 injuries including 38,478 temporary partial injuries and approximately 3,900 severely and permanently disabling injuries.

A cohort of 80,021 exposed people was registered, along with a control group, a cohort of 15,931 people from areas not exposed to MIC. Nearly every year since 1986, they have answered the same questionnaire. It shows excess mortality and morbidity in the exposed group. Bias and confounding factors cannot be excluded from the study. Because of migration and other factors, 75% of the cohort is lost, as the ones who move out are not followed.

A number of clinical studies are performed. The quality varies, but the different reports support each other. Studied and reported long-term health effects are:

- Eyes: Chronic conjunctivitis, scars on cornea, corneal opacities, early cataracts
- Respiratory tracts: Obstructive and/or restrictive disease, pulmonary fibrosis, aggravation of tuberculosis and chronic bronchitis
- Neurological system: Impairment of memory, finer motor skills, numbness, etc.
- Psychological problems: Post traumatic stress disorder (PTSD)
- Children's health: Peri- and neonatal death rates increased. Failure to grow, intellectual impairment, etc.

Missing or insufficient fields for research are female reproduction, chromosomal aberrations, cancer, immune deficiency, neurological sequelae, post traumatic stress disorder (PTSD) and children born after the disaster. Late cases that might never be highlighted are respiratory insufficiency, cardiac insufficiency (cor pulmonale), cancer and tuberculosis. Bhopal now has high rates of birth defects and records a miscarriage rate 7x higher than the national average.

A 2014 report in Mother Jones quotes a "spokesperson for the Bhopal Medical Appeal, which runs free health clinics for survivors" as saying "An estimated 120,000 to 150,000 survivors still struggle with serious medical conditions including nerve damage, growth problems, gynaecological disorders, respiratory issues, birth defects, and elevated rates of cancer and tuberculosis."

=== Health care ===
The Government of India had focused primarily on increasing the hospital-based services for gas victims; thus, hospitals had been built after the disaster. When UCC wanted to sell its shares in UCIL, it was directed by the Supreme Court to finance a 500-bed hospital for the medical care of the survivors. Thus, Bhopal Memorial Hospital and Research Centre (BMHRC) was inaugurated in 1998 and was obliged to give free care for survivors for eight years. BMHRC was a 350-bedded super speciality hospital where heart surgery and hemodialysis were done. There was a dearth of gynaecology, obstetrics and paediatrics. Eight mini-units (outreach health centres) were started and free health care for gas victims was to be offered until 2006. The management had also faced problems with strikes, and the quality of the health care being disputed. Sambhavna Trust is a charitable trust, registered in 1995, that gives modern as well as ayurvedic treatments to gas victims, free of charge.

=== Environmental rehabilitation ===
When the factory was closed in 1986, pipes, drums and tanks were sold. The MIC and the Sevin plants are still there, as are storages of different residues. Isolation material is falling down and spreading. The area around the plant was used as a dumping area for hazardous chemicals. In 1982, tube wells in the vicinity of the UCIL factory had to be abandoned and tests in 1989 performed by UCC's laboratory revealed that soil and water samples collected near the factory and inside the plant were toxic to fish. Several other studies had also shown polluted soil and groundwater in the area. Reported polluting compounds include 1-naphthol, naphthalene, Sevin, tarry residue, toxic organochlorines, volatile organochlorine compounds, mercury, chromium, copper, nickel, lead, hexachloroethane, hexachlorobutadiene, and the pesticide HCH (Hexachlorocyclohexane).

In order to provide safe drinking water to the population around the UCIL factory, the government of Madhya Pradesh proposed a water-supply improvement scheme. In December 2008, the Madhya Pradesh High Court decided that the toxic waste should be incinerated at Ankleshwar in Gujarat, which was met by protests from activists all over India. On 8 June 2012, the centre for incineration of toxic Bhopal waste agreed to pay ₹250 million (US$2.7 million) to dispose of UCIL chemical plants' waste in Germany. On 9 August 2012, Supreme court directed the Union and Madhya Pradesh Governments to take immediate steps for disposal of toxic waste lying around and inside the factory within six months.

A U.S. court rejected the lawsuit blaming UCC for causing soil and water pollution around the site of the plant and ruled that responsibility for remedial measures or related claims rested with the State Government and not with UCC. In 2005, the state government invited various Indian architects to enter their "concept for development of a memorial complex for Bhopal gas tragedy victims at the site of Union Carbide". In 2011, a conference was held on the site, with participants from European universities which was aimed for the same.

=== Occupational and habitation rehabilitation ===
Thirty-three of the 50 planned work-sheds for gas victims started. All except one was closed down by 1992. In 1986, the MP government invested in the Special Industrial Area Bhopal. One hundred and fifty-two of the planned 200 work sheds were built and in 2000, 16 were partially functioning. It was estimated that 50,000 persons need alternative jobs, and that less than 100 gas victims had found regular employment under the government's scheme. The government also planned 2,486 flats in two- and four-storey buildings in what is called the "widow's colony" outside Bhopal. The water did not reach the upper floors and it was not possible to keep cattle which was their primary occupation. Infrastructure like buses, schools, etc. were missing for at least a decade.

=== Economic rehabilitation ===
Immediate relief measures were determined two days after the tragedy. These measures commenced in 1985 when food was distributed for a short period along with ration cards. Madhya Pradesh government's finance department allocated ₹874 million (US$9.3 million) for victim relief in July 1985. Widow pension of ₹200 (US$2.10)/per month (later ₹750 (US$8.00)) was provided. The government also decided to pay ₹1,500 (US$16) to families with monthly income ₹500 (US$5.30) or less. As a result of the interim relief, more children were able to attend school, more money was spent on treatment and food, and housing also eventually improved. From 1990 interim relief of ₹200 (US$2.10) was paid to everyone in the family who was born before the disaster.

The total compensation, including interim relief for personal injury, was for the majority ₹25,000 (US$270). For death claims, the average sum paid out was ₹62,000 (US$660). Each claimant was to be categorised by a doctor. In court, the claimants were expected to prove "beyond reasonable doubt" that death or injury in each case was attributable to exposure. In 1992, 44 percent of the claimants still had to be medically examined.

By the end of October 2003, according to the Bhopal Gas Tragedy Relief and Rehabilitation Department, compensation had been awarded to 554,895 people for injuries received and 15,310 survivors of those killed. The average amount to families of the dead was $2,200.

In 2007, 1,029,517 cases were registered and decided. The number of awarded cases was 574,304 and the number of rejected cases was 455,213. Total compensation awarded was ₹15,465 million (US$170 million). On 24 June 2010, the Union Cabinet of the Government of India approved a ₹12,650 million (US$140 million) aid package which would be funded by Indian taxpayers through the government.

=== Other impacts ===
In 1985, Henry Waxman, an American politician, called for a U.S. government inquiry into the Bhopal disaster, which resulted in U.S. legislation regarding the accidental release of toxic chemicals in the United States.

== Causes ==
A combination of poorly-maintained or non-functional facilities, a disregard of safety standards, and an under-trained workforce made it possible for water to leak into the MIC tanks in the absence of properly working safety systems.

Union Carbide held the view that concerted human effort is required for water to enter the tank, and argued that such action is conducted by a rogue employee, who hooked a water hose directly to an empty valve on the side of the tank. Union Carbide alleges that the Indian government took extensive actions to hide this possibility in order to attach blame to UCC.

Theories differ as to how the water entered the tank. At the time, workers were cleaning out a clogged pipe with water about 120 metres (400 ft) from the tank. They claimed that they were not told to isolate the tank with a pipe slip-blind plate. The operators assumed that owing to bad maintenance and leaking valves, it was possible for the water to leak into the tank.

This water entry route could not be reproduced despite strenuous efforts by motivated parties. UCC claims that a "disgruntled worker" deliberately connecting a hose to a pressure gauge connection was the real cause.

Early the next morning, a UCIL manager asked the instrument engineer to replace the gauge. UCIL's investigation team found no evidence of the necessary connection; the investigation was totally controlled by the government, denying UCC investigators access to the tank or interviews with the operators.

=== Corporate negligence ===
This point of view argues that management (and to some extent, local government) underinvested in safety, which allowed for a dangerous working environment to develop. Factors cited include the filling of the MIC tanks beyond recommended levels, poor maintenance after the plant ceased MIC production at the end of 1984, allowing several safety systems to be inoperable due to poor maintenance, and switching off safety systems to save money— including the MIC tank refrigeration system which could have mitigated the disaster severity, and non-existent catastrophe management plans. Other factors identified by government inquiries included undersized safety devices and the dependence on manual operations. Specific plant management deficiencies that were identified include the lack of skilled operators, reduction of safety management, insufficient maintenance, and inadequate emergency action plans.

==== Underinvestment ====
Underinvestment is cited as contributing to a dangerous environment. In attempts to reduce expenses, $1.25 million worth of cuts were placed upon the plant, which affected the factory's employees and their conditions. Kurzman argues that "cuts ... meant less stringent quality control and thus looser safety rules. A pipe leaked? Don't replace it, employees said they were told ... MIC workers needed more training? They could do with less. Promotions were halted, seriously affecting employee morale and driving some of the most skilled ... elsewhere". Workers were forced to use English manuals, even though only a few had a grasp of the language.

Subsequent research highlights a gradual deterioration of safety practices in regard to the MIC, which had become less relevant to plant operations. By 1984, only six of the original 12 operators were still working with MIC and the number of supervisory personnel had also been halved. No maintenance supervisor was placed on the night shift and instrument readings were taken every two hours, rather than the previous and required one-hour readings. Workers made complaints about the cuts through their union but were ignored. One employee was fired after going on a 15-day hunger strike. Seventy percent of the plant's employees were fined before the disaster for refusing to deviate from the proper safety regulations under pressure from the management.

In addition, some observers, such as those writing in the Trade Environmental Database (TED) Case Studies as part of the Mandala Project from American University, have pointed to "serious communication problems and management gaps between Union Carbide and its Indian operation", characterised by "the parent companies [sic] hands-off approach to its overseas operation" and "cross-cultural barriers".

==== Adequacy of equipment and regulations ====
The factory was not well equipped to handle the gas created by the sudden addition of water to the MIC tank. The MIC tank alarms had not been working for four years and there was only one manual back-up system, compared to a four-stage system used in the United States. The flare tower and several vent gas scrubbers had been out of service for five months before the disaster. Only one gas scrubber was operating: it could not treat such a large amount of MIC with sodium hydroxide (caustic soda), which would have brought the concentration down to a safe level. The flare tower could only handle a quarter of the gas that leaked in 1984, and moreover it was out of order at the time of the accident. To reduce energy costs, the refrigeration system was idle. The MIC was kept at 20 degrees Celsius, not the 4.5 degrees advised by the manual. Even the steam boiler, intended to clean the pipes, was non-operational for unknown reasons. Slip-blind plates that would have prevented water from pipes being cleaned from leaking into the MIC tanks if the valves had been faulty were not installed and their installation had been omitted from the cleaning checklist. As MIC is water-soluble, deluge guns were in place to contain escaping gases from the stack. The water pressure was too weak for the guns to spray high enough to reach the gas which would have reduced the concentration of escaping gas significantly. In addition to it, carbon steel valves were used at the factory, even though they were known to corrode when exposed to acid.

According to the operators, the MIC tank pressure gauge had been malfunctioning for roughly a week. Other tanks were used, rather than repairing the gauge. The build-up in temperature and pressure is believed to have affected the magnitude of the gas release. UCC admitted in their own investigation report that most of the safety systems were not functioning on the night of 3 December 1984. The design of the MIC plant, following government guidelines, was "Indianized" by UCIL engineers to maximise the use of indigenous materials and products. Mumbai-based Humphreys and Glasgow Consultants Pvt. Ltd., were the main consultants, Larsen & Toubro fabricated the MIC storage tanks, and Taylor of India Ltd. provided the instrumentation. In 1998, during civil action suits in India, it emerged that the plant was not prepared for problems. No action plans had been established to cope with accidents of this magnitude. This included not informing local authorities of the quantities or dangers of chemicals used and manufactured at Bhopal.

==== Safety audits ====
Safety audits were done every year in the US and European UCC plants, but only every two years in other parts of the world. Before a "Business Confidential" safety audit by UCC in May 1982, the senior officials of the corporation were well aware of "a total of 61 hazards, 30 of them major and 11 minor in the dangerous phosgene/methyl isocyanate units" in Bhopal. In the 1982 audit, it was indicated that worker performance was below standards. Ten major concerns were listed. UCIL prepared an action plan, but UCC never sent a follow-up team to Bhopal. Many of the items in the 1982 report were temporarily fixed, but by 1984, conditions had again deteriorated. In September 1984, an internal UCC report on the West Virginia plant in the United States revealed a number of defects and malfunctions. It warned that "a runaway reaction could occur in the MIC unit storage tanks, and that the planned response would not be timely or effective enough to prevent catastrophic failure of the tanks". This report was never forwarded to the Bhopal plant, although the main design was the same.

==== Impossibility of the "negligence" ====
According to the "Corporate Negligence" argument, workers had been cleaning out pipes with water nearby. This water was diverted due to a combination of improper maintenance, leaking and clogging, and eventually ended up in the MIC storage tank. Indian scientists also suggested that additional water might have been introduced as a "back-flow" from a defectively designed vent-gas scrubber. None of these theoretical routes of entry were ever successfully demonstrated during tests by the Central Bureau of Investigation (CBI) and UCIL engineers.

A Union Carbide commissioned analysis conducted by Arthur D. Little claims that the Negligence argument was impossible for several tangible reasons:

1. The pipes being used by the nearby workers were only 1/2 inch (13 mm) in diameter and were physically incapable of producing enough hydraulic pressure to raise the water more than 10 feet (3.0 m) that would have been necessary to enable the water to "backflow" into the MIC tank.
2. A key intermediate valve would have had to be open for the Negligence argument to apply. This valve was "tagged" closed, meaning that it had been inspected and found to be closed. While it is possible for open valves to clog over time, the only way a closed valve allows penetration is if there is leakage, and 1985 tests carried out by the government of India found this valve to be non-leaking.
3. In order for water to have reached the MIC tank from the pipe-cleaning area, it would have had to flow through a significant network of pipes ranging from 6 to 8 inches (150 to 200 mm) in diameter, before rising 3.0 metres (10 ft) and flowing into the MIC tank. Had this occurred, most of the water that was in those pipes at the time the tank had its critical reaction would have remained in those pipes, as there was no drain for them. Investigation by the Indian government in 1985 revealed that the pipes were bone dry.

=== Employee sabotage ===
Now owned by Dow Chemical Company, Union Carbide maintains a website dedicated to the tragedy and claims that the accident was the result of sabotage, stating that sufficient safety systems were in place and operative to prevent the intrusion of water.

The Union Carbide-commissioned Arthur D. Little report concluded that it was likely that a single employee secretly and deliberately introduced a large amount of water into the MIC tank by removing a meter and connecting a water hose directly to the tank through the metering port.

UCC claims the plant staff falsified numerous records to distance themselves from the accident and absolve themselves of blame, and that the Indian government impeded its investigation and declined to prosecute the employee responsible, presumably because it would weaken its allegations of negligence by Union Carbide.

The evidence advanced by UCC, alleged to support this hypothesis:

1. A key witness testified that when he entered the control room at 12:15 am, prior to the disaster, the "atmosphere was tense and quiet".
2. Another key witness (the "instrument supervisor") testified that when he arrived at the scene immediately following the accident, he noticed that the local pressure indicator on the critical Tank 610 was missing, and that he had found a hose lying next to the empty manhead created by the missing pressure indicator, and that the hose had had water running out of it. (This testimony was corroborated by other witnesses.)
3. Graphological analysis revealed major attempts to alter logfiles and destroy log evidence.
4. Other logfiles show that the control team had attempted to purge one ton of material out of Tank 610 immediately prior to the disaster. An attempt was then made to cover up this transfer via log alteration. Water is heavier than MIC, and the transfer line is attached to the bottom of the tank. The Arthur D. Little report concludes from this that the transfer was an effort to transfer water out of Tank 610 that had been discovered there.
5. Second-hand and third-hand recounting of events yielded two accounts that corroborated UCC's conspiracy hypothesis; an operator from a different unit stated that after the release, two MIC operators had told him that water had entered the tank through a pressure gauge. One employee stated that "he had been told by a close friend of one of the MIC operators that water had entered through a tube that had been connected to the tank." This had been allegedly discovered by the other MIC operators who then tried to open and close valves to prevent the release.

The Little report argues that this evidence demonstrates that the following chronology took place:

- At 10:20 pm, the tank was at normal pressure, indicating the absence of water.
- At 10:45 pm, a shift change took place, after which the MIC storage area "would be completely deserted". During this period, a "disgruntled operator entered the storage area and hooked up one of the readily available rubber water hoses to Tank 610, with the intention of contaminating and spoiling the tank's contents."
- Water began to flow, beginning the chemical reaction that caused the disaster.
- After midnight, control room operators noticed the pressure rising and realized there was a problem with Tank 610. They discovered the water connection and decided to transfer one ton of the contents out to try to remove the water. The MIC release then occurred.
- The cover-up activities discovered during the investigation then took place.
- After over 30 years, in November 2017, S. P. Choudhary, former MIC production manager, claimed in court that the disaster was not an accident but the result of a sabotage that claimed thousands of lives.

Choudhary's counsel, Anirban Roy, argued that the theory of design defects was floated by the central government in its endeavour to protect the victims of the tragedy. Everyone else involved in investigating the case "just toed the line of the central government. ... The government and the CBI suppressed the actual truth and saved the real perpetrators of the crime."

Roy argued to the district court that M. L. Verma, a disgruntled plant operator at odds with senior management, was behind the sabotage. The counsel argued there were discrepancies in statements given by persons operating the plant at that time, but the central agency decided against a proper investigation in order to characterize the event as a mishap and not sabotage. He alleged that Verma was unhappy with Choudhary and Mukund.

== Additional Union Carbide actions ==
The corporation denied the claim that valves on the tank were malfunctioning and claimed that documented evidence gathered after the accident showed the valve closest to the plant's water-washing operation was closed and leak-tight. Furthermore, process safety systems had prevented water from entering the tank by accident. Carbide states that all safety concerns identified in 1982 were allayed before 1984 and had nothing to do with the accident.

The company admitted that safety systems in place would not have been able to prevent a chemical reaction of such magnitude from causing a leak. According to Carbide, "in designing the plant's safety systems, a chemical reaction of this magnitude was not factored in" because "the tank's gas storage system was designed to automatically prevent such a large amount of water from being inadvertently introduced into the system" and "process safety systems—in place and operational—would have prevented water from entering the tank by accident". Instead, they claim that "employee sabotage—not faulty design or operation—was the cause of the tragedy".

Tactical response

The company stresses the immediate action taken after the disaster and its continued commitment to helping the victims. On 4 December, the day following the leak, Union Carbide sent material aid and several international medical experts to assist the medical facilities in Bhopal.

Financial response

The primary financial restitution paid by UCC was negotiated in 1989, when the Indian Supreme Court approved a settlement of US$470 million (₹1,055 crore; equivalent to $1.06 billion in 2025). This amount was immediately paid by UCC to the Indian government. The company states that the restitution paid "was $120 million more than plaintiffs' lawyers had told U.S. courts was fair" and that the Indian Supreme Court stated in its opinion that "compensation levels under the settlement were far greater than would normally be payable under Indian law."

In the immediate aftermath of the disaster, Union Carbide states on its website that it donated $2 million to the Indian prime minister's immediate disaster relief fund on 11 December 1984. The corporation established the Employees' Bhopal Relief Fund in February 1985, which raised more than $5 million for immediate relief. According to Union Carbide, in August 1987, they made an additional $4.6 million in humanitarian interim relief available.

Union Carbide stated that it also undertook several steps to provide continuing aid to the victims of the Bhopal disaster, including the sale of its 50.9% interest in UCIL in April 1992 and establishment of a charitable trust to contribute to the building of a local hospital. The sale was finalised in November 1994. Construction began in October 1995 and the hospital opened in 2001. The company provided a fund of around $90 million from sale of its UCIL stock. In 1991, the trust had amounted to approximately $100 million. The hospital specialized in the treatment of heart, lung and eye problems. UCC also provided a $2.2 million grant to Arizona State University to establish a vocational-technical centre in Bhopal, which was opened, but was later closed by the state government. They also donated $5 million to the Indian Red Cross after the disaster. They also developed a Responsible Care system with other members of the chemical industry as a response to the Bhopal crisis, which was designed to help prevent such an event in the future.

=== Charges against UCC and UCIL employees ===
UCC chairman and CEO Warren Anderson was arrested and released on bail by the Madhya Pradesh Police in Bhopal on 7 December 1984. Anderson was taken to UCC's house after which he was released six hours later on $2,100 bail and flown out on a government plane. These actions were allegedly taken under the direction of then chief secretary of the state, who was possibly instructed from the chief minister's office, who himself flew out of Bhopal immediately. Later in 1987, the Indian government summoned Anderson, eight other executives and two company affiliates to appear in Indian court on homicide charges. In response, Union Carbide said the company is not under Indian jurisdiction.

In May 1988, Indian businessman J. R. D. Tata wrote a confidential letter to the then Prime Minister, Rajiv Gandhi, conveying Henry Kissinger's concern about delay in reaching a settlement. At the time, Kissinger was an adviser to Union Carbide and other US corporations. Rajiv Gandhi indicated that he would consider Kissinger's advice. The opposition Bharatiya Janata Party alleged that Rajiv Gandhi protected Warren Anderson in a secret political deal with U.S. President Ronald Reagan, with Gandhi securing Reagan's pardon of Adil Shahryar in exchange.

Dow was a named respondent in cases arising from Union Carbide's business in Bhopal.

== Ongoing contamination ==
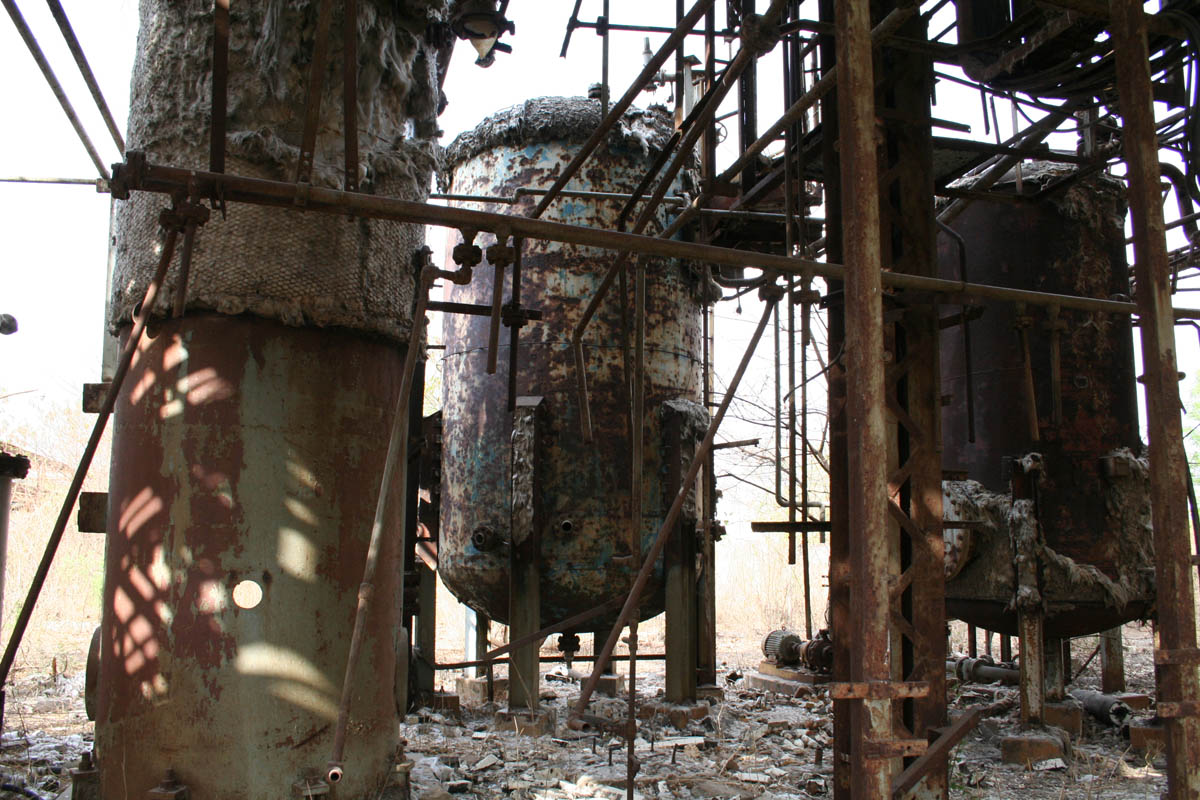
Deteriorating section of the MIC plant in 2008, decades after the gas leak

Chemicals abandoned at the plant continue to leak and pollute the groundwater. Whether the chemicals pose a health hazard is disputed. Contamination at the site and surrounding area was not caused by the gas leakage. The area around the plant was used as a dumping ground for hazardous chemicals and by 1982 water wells in the vicinity of the UCIL factory had to be abandoned. UCC states that "after the incident, UCIL began clean-up work at the site under the direction of Indian central and state government authorities". The work was continued from 1994 by Eveready Industries India, Limited (EIIL) who was UCIL's successor. In 1998, the Madhya Pradesh State Government, which owned and had been leasing the property to EIIL, cancelled the lease, took over the facility and assumed all accountability for the site, including the completion of any remediation.

UCC's laboratory tests in 1989 revealed that soil and water samples collected from near the factory were toxic to fish. Twenty-one areas inside the plant were reported to be highly polluted. In 1991 the municipal authorities declared that water from over 100 wells was hazardous for health if used for drinking. In 1994 it was reported that 21% of the factory premises were seriously contaminated with chemicals. Beginning in 1999, studies made by Greenpeace and others from soil, groundwater, well water and vegetables from the residential areas around UCIL and from the UCIL factory area show contamination with a range of toxic heavy metals and chemical compounds. Substances found, according to the reports, are 1-Naphthol, naphthalene, Sevin, tarry residues, organochlorines, mercury, chromium, copper, nickel, lead, hexachlorethane, hexachlorobutadiene, pesticide HCH, volatile organic compounds and halo-organics. Many of these contaminants were also found in breast milk of women living near the area. Soil tests were conducted by Greenpeace in 1999. One sample (IT9012) from "sediment collected from drain under former Sevin plant" showed mercury levels to be at "20,000 and 6 million times" higher than expected levels. Organochlorine compounds at elevated levels were also present in groundwater collected from (sample IT9040) a 4.4 metres (14 ft) depth "bore-hole within the former UCIL site". This sample was obtained from a source posted with a warning sign which read "Water unfit for consumption". Chemicals that have been linked to various forms of cancer were also discovered, as well as trichloroethylene, known to impair foetal development, at 50 times above safety limits specified by the U.S. Environmental Protection Agency (EPA). In 2002, an inquiry by Fact-Finding Mission on Bhopal found a number of toxins, including mercury, lead, 1,3,5 trichlorobenzene, dichloromethane and chloroform, in nursing women's breast milk.

A 2004 BBC Radio 5 broadcast reported the site is contaminated with toxic chemicals including hexachlorocyclohexane and mercury, held in open containers or loose on the ground. A drinking water sample from a well near the site had levels of contamination 500 times higher than the maximum limits recommended by the World Health Organization. In 2009, the Centre for Science and Environment, a Delhi-based pollution monitoring lab, released test results showing pesticide groundwater contamination up to three kilometres from the factory. Also in 2009, the BBC took a water sample from a frequently used hand pump, located just north of the plant. The sample, tested in UK, was found to contain 1,000 times the World Health Organization's recommended maximum amount of carbon tetrachloride, which causes liver and kidney damage, and is "possibly carcinogenic to humans".

In 2010, a British photojournalist ventured into the abandoned UCIL factory to investigate allegations of abandoned, leaking toxins. He was hospitalized in Bhopal for a week after he was exposed to chemicals. Doctors at the Sambhavna Clinic treated him with oxygen, painkillers and anti-inflammatories following a severe respiratory reaction to toxic dust inside the factory.

In October 2011, the Institute of Environmental Management and Assessment published an article and video by two British environmental scientists, showing the current state of the plant, landfill and solar evaporation ponds and calling for renewed international efforts to provide the necessary skills to clean up the site and contaminated groundwater.

On December 3, 2024, the 40th anniversary of the incident, Madhya Pradesh High Court ruled that the site must be cleaned up in the next month. Despite protests against a plan to incinerate the hazardous waste in Pithampur, on January 1, 2025, an overnight caravan of a dozen semi trucks with police escort, a quick-response team, fire engines and ambulances delivered 377 tons of waste to Pithampur Industrial Area for incineration. Despite promises that the several hundred tons of toxic waste will be processed safely and responsibly, protests continued in Pithampur.

== In popular culture ==
=== Novels ===
- Amulya Malladi's 2002 novel A Breath of Fresh Air relates the story of a mother and son who develop health issues as a result of exposure to gas at Bhopal. The book is based on Malladi's recollections of Bhopal during the accident.
- Indra Sinha released Animal's People in 2007. The novel tells the story of a boy who is born with a spinal condition due to effects of the gas. The book was shortlisted for the Man Booker Prize.
- Arundhati Roy's 2017 novel The Ministry of Utmost Happiness which deals with many contemporary political issues in India, also features several characters still dealing with the aftermath of the gas leak.
- Annie Murray's novel Mother and Child (2019) is partly set in post-disaster Bhopal.

=== Films and television ===
- Bhopal Express, 1999 film.
- "Bhopal Nightmare" (2011), the sixth episode of season 4 of the television docudrama series Seconds from Disaster.
- In 2014, to coincide with the 30th anniversary of the disaster, the historical drama Bhopal: A Prayer for Rain was released, starring Martin Sheen as Union Carbide CEO Warren Anderson, Kal Penn, and Mischa Barton.
- The Railway Men: The Untold Story of Bhopal 1984 starring KK Menon, R Madhavan, Divyendu Sharma and Babil Khan is a four-part web series that was released on 18 November 2023 on Netflix.

== Activism ==
=== Local ===
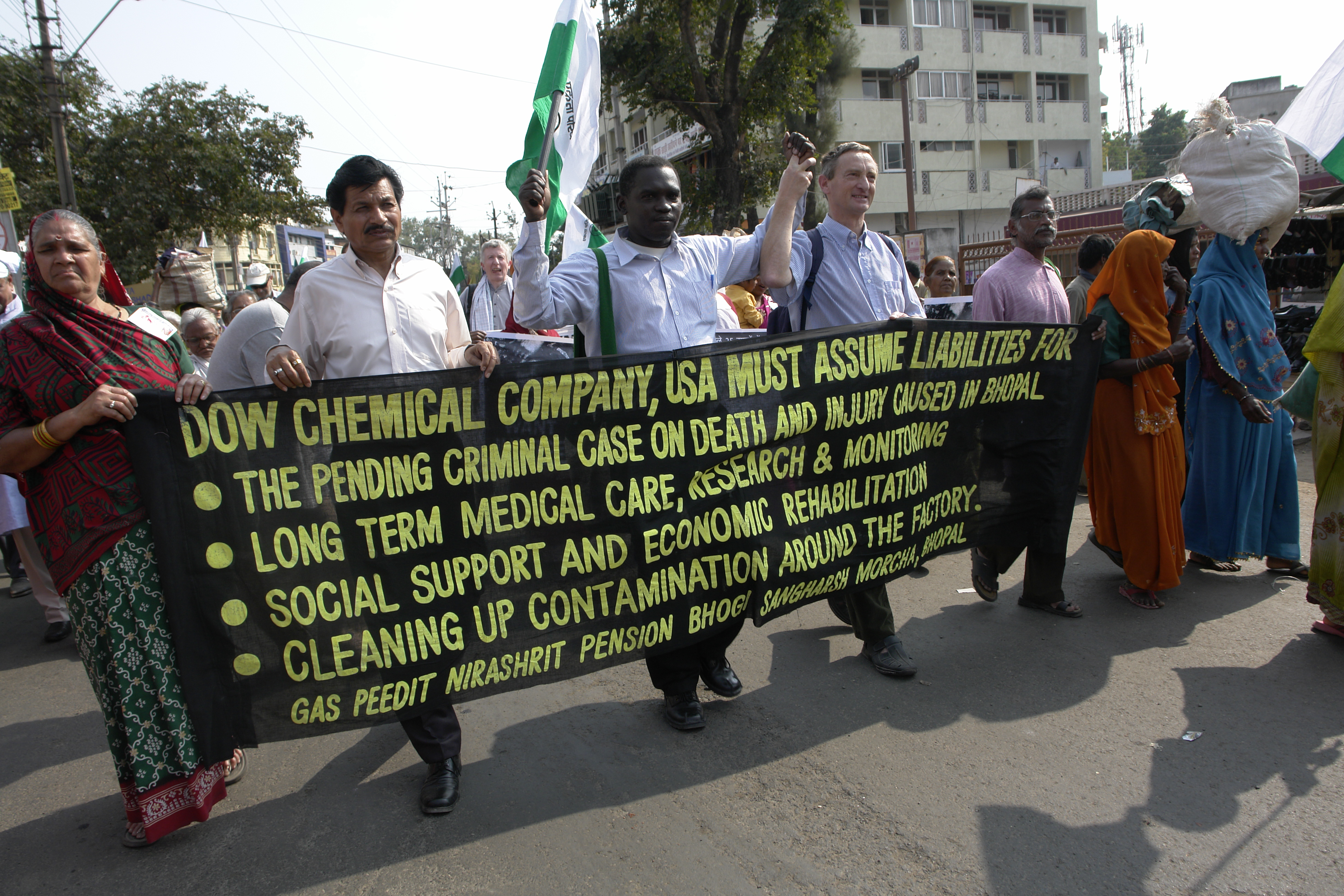
Protest in Bhopal in 2010

Since 1984, individual activists have played a role in the aftermath of the tragedy. The best-known is Satinath Sarangi (Sathyu), a metallurgic engineer who arrived at Bhopal the day after the leakage. He founded several activist groups, as well as Sambhavna Trust, the clinic for gas-affected patients, where he is the manager. Other activists include Rashida Bee and Champa Devi Shukla, who received the Goldman Prize in 2004, Abdul Jabbar and Rachna Dhingra. Soon after the accident, other representatives from different activist groups arrived. The activists worked on organising the gas victims, which led to violent repression from the police and the government.

Numerous actions have been taken: demonstrations, sit-ins, hunger strikes, marches combined with pamphlets, books, and articles. Every anniversary, actions are performed. Often these include marches around Old Bhopal, ending with burning an effigy of Warren Anderson.

When government aid was ineffective, activist groups such as Zahreeli Gas Khand Sangharsh Morcha (Poisonous Gas-Event Struggle Front) mobilized. Morcha was heterogenous in its membership, including gas victims, volunteers from smaller towns, and middle-class activists from large cities. Morcha outlined a four-pronged approach: 1) counter governmental and company efforts to remove the disaster from the press 2) mobilize gas victims 3) present alternatives to governmental programmes 4) establish a larger network of organization to debate more systemic issues. Morcha took a revolutionary approach but lacked constructive engagement with the state. Afterwards the Bhopal Gas-Affected Women's Trade Union formed. BGPMUS protested the closing of a sewing centre and saw effective action.

=== International ===
Cooperation with international NGOs including Pesticide Action Network UK and Greenpeace started soon after the tragedy. One of the earliest reports is the Trade Union report from ILO 1985.

In 1992, a session of the Permanent Peoples' Tribunal on Industrial Hazards and Human Rights took place in Bhopal, and in 1996, the "Charter on Industrial Hazards and Human Rights" was adopted.

In 1994, the International Medical Commission on Bhopal (IMCB) met in Bhopal. Their work contributed to long-term health effects being officially recognised.

=== Organizations ===
More than 14 different NGOs were immediately engaged and 15 international, national and local organisations have been engaged including:

- International Campaign for Justice in Bhopal (ICJB), coordinates international activities
- Bhopal Medical Appeal, collects funds for the Sambhavna Trust
- Sambhavna Trust or Bhopal People's Health and Documentation Clinic. Provides medical care for gas affected patients and those living in water-contaminated area
- Chingari Trust, provides medical care for children being born in Bhopal with malformations and brain damages
- Students for Bhopal, based in the United States
- International Medical Commission on Bhopal, provided medical information 1994–2000
- Bhopal Gas Peedit Mahila-Stationery Karmachari Sangh
- Bhopal Gas Peedit Mahila Udyog Sangthan

=== Settlement fund hoax ===
On 3 December 2004, the twentieth anniversary of the disaster, a man falsely claiming to be a Dow representative named Jude Finisterra was interviewed on BBC World News. He claimed that the company had agreed to clean up the site and compensate those harmed in the accident, by liquidating Union Carbide for US$12 billion. Dow quickly issued a statement saying that they had no employee by that name—that he was an impostor, not affiliated with Dow, and that his claims were a hoax. The BBC later broadcast a correction and an apology.

Jude Finisterra was actually Andy Bichlbaum, a member of the activist prankster group The Yes Men. In 2002, The Yes Men issued a fake press release explaining why Dow refused to take responsibility for the disaster and started up a website, at "DowEthics.com", designed to look like the real Dow website, but containing false information.

=== Monitoring of activists ===
The Stratfor email leak revealed that Dow Chemical had engaged Stratfor to spy on the public and personal lives of activists involved in the Bhopal disaster, including the Yes Men. E-mails to Dow representatives from hired security analysts list the YouTube videos liked, Twitter and Facebook posts made and the public appearances of these activists. Journalists, filmmakers and authors who were investigating Bhopal and covering the issue of ongoing contamination, such as Jack Laurenson and Max Carlson, were also placed under surveillance. Stratfor released a statement condemning the revelation by Wikileaks while neither confirming nor denying the accuracy of the reports and would only state that it had acted within the bounds of the law. Dow Chemical also refrained from commenting on the matter.

Ingrid Eckerman, a member of the International Medical Commission on Bhopal, has been denied a visa to visit India.

== See also ==
- Environmental racism – Environmental injustice that occurs within a racialized context
- List of industrial disasters
- Ludhiana gas leak – Fatal incident in Punjab, India
- System accident – Unanticipated interaction of multiple failures in a complex system

== Sources ==
- Cassels J (1993). The Uncertain Promise of Law: Lessons From Bhopal. University of Toronto Press.
- Chouhan TR, Jaising I, et al. (2004) [1994]. Bhopal: the Inside Story – Carbide Workers Speak Out on the World's Worst Industrial Disaster. US and India: The Apex Press and Other India Press. ISBN 978-1-891843-30-3. Main author Chouhan was an operator at the plant. Contains many technical details.
- D'Silva, T. (2006). The Black Box of Bhopal: A Closer Look at the World's Deadliest Industrial Disaster. Victoria, BC: Trafford. ISBN 978-1-4120-8412-3. Archived from the original on 7 December 2023. Review Archived 29 August 2008 at the Wayback Machine Written by a retired former employee of UCC who was a member of the investigation committee. Includes several original documents including correspondence between UCIL and the Ministries of the Government of India.
- Kovel J (2002). The Enemy of Nature: The End of Capitalism or the End of the World?. London: Zed Books. ISBN 978-1-55266-255-7. Archived from the original on 7 December 2023.
- Kurzman D (1987). A Killing Wind: Inside Union Carbide and the Bhopal Catastrophe. New York: McGraw-Hill.
- Lepowski W (19 December 1994). "Ten Years Later: Bhopal". Chemical and Engineering News.
- Sriramachari S (10 April 2004). "The Bhopal gas tragedy: An environmental disaster" (PDF). Current Science. 86 (7): 905–20. Archived from the original (PDF) on 30 October 2008.
- Stringer R, Labunska I, Brigden K, Santillo D (November 2002). Chemical Stockpiles at Union Carbide India Limited in Bhopal: An investigation (Technical Note 12/2002) (PDF). Greenpeace Research Laboratories. Archived from the original (PDF) on 27 November 2009.
- Weir D (1987). The Bhopal Syndrome: Pesticides, Environment and Health. San Francisco: Sierra Club Books. ISBN 978-0-87156-718-5.
