= Anne Murray (disambiguation) =

Anne Murray is a Canadian singer.

Anne or Annie Murray may also refer to:

- Anne Firth Murray (born 1935), New Zealand author, professor, and nonprofit founder
- Anne Halkett (1623–1699), née Murray, religious writer and autobiographer
- Anne Murray, Countess of Kinghorne, Scottish courtier said to have been the mistress of James VI
- Anne Murray, Duchess of Atholl (1814–1897), Scottish courtier and close friend of Queen Victoria
- Anne Murray (album), a 1996 album by the singer
- Anne Murray (gentlewoman) (1755–1849), author
- Anne Murray, Viscountess Bayning, on List of life peerages before 1876
- Anne Murray (camogie) in Gael Linn Cup 1987
- Anne Murray (cricketer) (born 1961), Irish cricketer
- Anne Murray Dike (1879–1929), American doctor, chair of the American Committee for Devastated France
- Annie Murray (1906–1996), Scottish nurse in the Spanish Civil War
- Annie Murray (writer), British romance writer

== See also ==
- Ann Murray (born 1949), Irish mezzo-soprano
- Anna Murray (disambiguation)
