= International Campaign for Justice in Bhopal =

Activist coalition

The International Campaign for Justice in Bhopal (ICJB) is a coalition of disaster survivors and environmental, social justice, progressive Indian, and human rights groups that have joined forces to hold the Indian Government and Dow Chemical Corporation accountable for the ongoing chemical disaster in Bhopal.

== Stated mission ==
- To ensure adequate health care and rehabilitation for the survivors (and their children) of the Bhopal Disaster.
- To achieve a safe environment in Bhopal by proper remediation.
- To bring to trial those charged with crimes, and secure heavy punishment of the guilty.
- To pressure the United States, India, Union Carbide's current owner the Dow Chemical Company to realize these aims.

== Beliefs ==
1. The Precautionary Principle
2. The Polluter Pays Principle
3. The Right to Know
4. International Liability
5. Environmental Justice

== Aims ==
- To bring Warren Anderson to criminal court in India.
- To bring Union Carbide Corporation to criminal court in India in the corporate person of Dow Chemical which acquired Union Carbide in 2001.
- To get Dow Chemical to
  - pay further compensation to the Bhopal Disaster victims;
  - pay for the long-term health care of the Bhopal Disaster survivors;
  - release any medical information about the released gases that they hold as trade secrets;
  - pay for the environmental clean-up of the
    - abandoned plant;
    - surrounding land;
    - ground water; and
    - local drinking water supplies;
  - provide clean & safe drinking water to communities with polluted water.

== Bibliography ==
=== Further reading ===
- Bridget Hanna (2005). The Bhopal Reader: Remembering Twenty Years of the World's Worst Industrial Disaster. Sydney: Apex Press.
- Eckerman, Ingrid (2005). The Bhopal Saga—Causes and Consequences of the World's Largest Industrial Disaster. India: Universities Press. doi:10.13140/2.1.3457.5364. ISBN 81-7371-515-7.
- Upendra Baxi (2007). Human Rights in a Posthuman World : Critical Essays. India: Oxford University Press (India).
- Upendra Baxi (1986). Inconvenient Forum and Convenient Catastrophe: The Bhopal Case. India, Bombay: NM Tripathi.
- Upendra Baxi (1986). Mass Disasters and Multinational Liability: The Bhopal Case. India: NM Tripathi.
