= Abdul Jabbar Khan (activist) =

Indian activist (1957–2019)

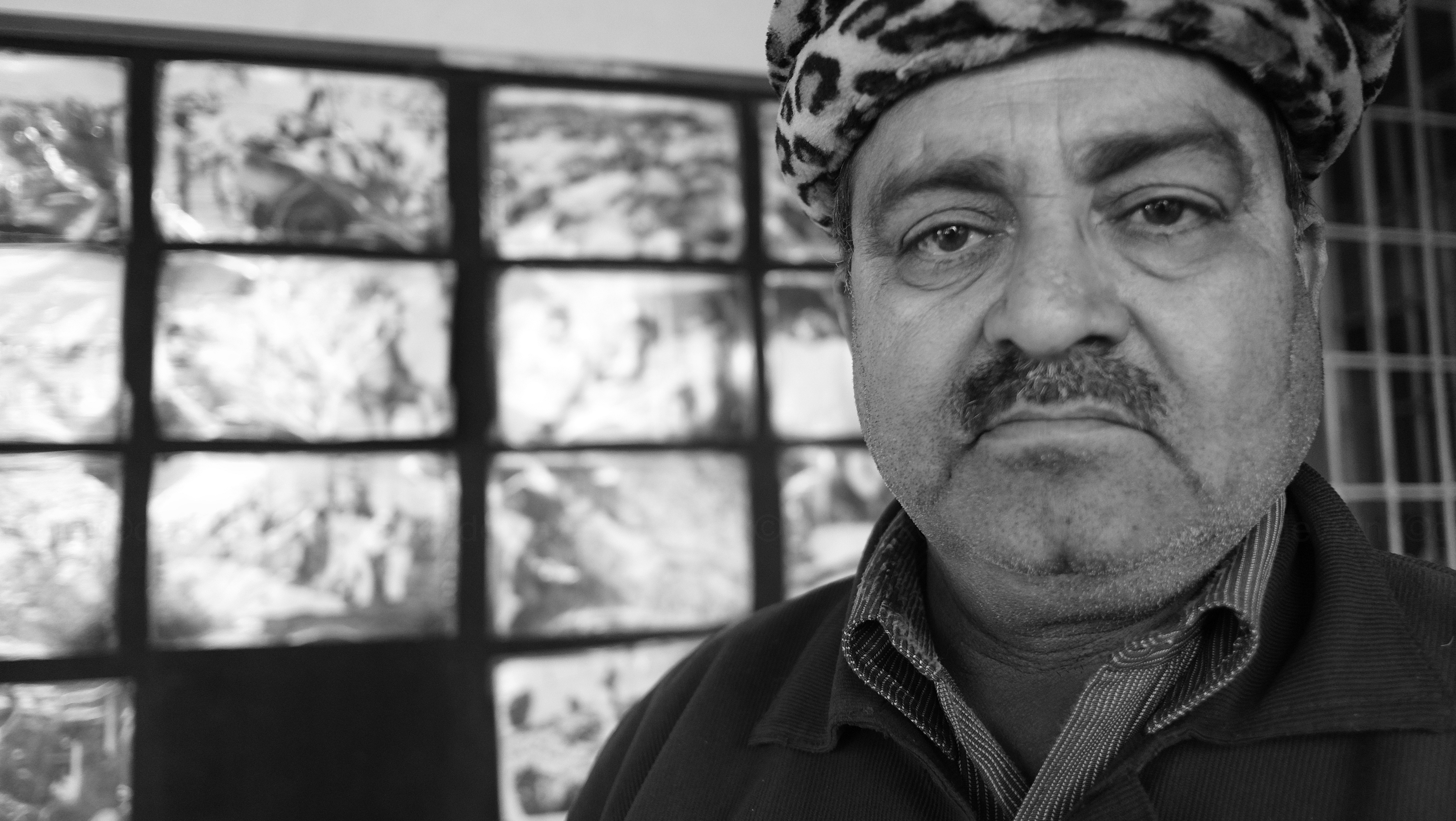
- Jabbar in 2013
- Born: 1 June 1957
- Died: 14 November 2019 (aged 62); Bhopal, Madhya Pradesh
- Known for: Activism for Bhopal Gas Disaster victims
- Spouse: Saira Banu
- Awards: Padma Shri

Abdul Jabbar Khan (1 June 1957 – 14 November 2019) was an activist who fought for the victims of Bhopal Gas Disaster. Himself a victim of the gas leak, he devoted decades of his life, up until his death, towards seeking justice for the victims by fighting for their fair treatment and rehabilitation.

A Guardian editorial called him "The most effective campaigner for the victims of the worst industrial accident in world history". Siddhartha Deb described his activism as being slow and stubborn. Owing to Jabbar's charisma, approachability and ability to interact with common people, he enjoyed popular support and deep local roots.

The Indian government awarded him the fourth-highest civilian award, Padma Shri, posthumously in 2020.

== Early life ==
Jabbar came from a poor Muslim family which moved to Bhopal when he was one year old. He worked in the construction business, responsible for digging borewells.

== Activism ==
On the intervening night of 2–3 December 1984, Jabbar was awakened by the odour of lethal methyl isocyanate gas emanating from the Union Carbide plant around 2 kilometers from his parents' home in Rajendra Nagar, Bhopal. He rushed his mother to a safe place 40 kilometers away. Upon returning to the city, he saw dead bodies lined up on the roadside. He started voluntarily working among the victims, helping people get treatment at the state hospital and taking bodies for postmortem. He shifted his complete attention toward activism and his business shut down. As a result of the gas leak, he suffered from lung fibrosis and his vision diminished. Many of his family members were killed by the gas leak and its after-effects.

In 1987, Jabbar set up the Bhopal Gas Peedit Mahila Udyog Sangathan (BGPMUS) or Bhopal Gas-Affected Women's Enterprise Organization, also referred to as Sangathana, a grassroots organization composed mostly of women, which has been at the forefront of struggles against the Union Carbide Corporation (UCC) which owned the pesticide plant resulting in the infamous gas leak. The advocacy group consists of gas survivors and widowed women rendered destitute by the tragedy. They have been involved in every legal initiative seeking justice for the victims and have consistently sought fair compensation, medical rehabilitation, prosecution of UCC officials. Jabbar, the convener of the group, was responsible for delivering public statements, negotiating with the governments and making decisions about the group's strategies. Dismayed by the meagre amount of food compensation being provided to the victims, Jabbar started his first campaign seeking employment for them with the slogan "Khairat nahi, rozgar chahiye (We don't require charity, we want jobs)". They were successful in setting up an economic rehabilitation centre called Swabhimaan Kendra (self-respect centre) which provides training in sewing, making stuffed toys, zardozi strips and bags.

In 1988, Jabbar filed a petition in the Supreme Court seeking interim relief for the victims until they receive their final compensation. In 1989, the Supreme Court announced a final settlement proposal in which the UCC will pay the government $470 million, as opposed to the initial demand of $3 billion, and be discharged of all civil and criminal liability. Dissatisfied by the meagre amount, 3500 BGPMUS members traveled to Delhi where they organized widespread protests for months. There were also reports of police violence against the women. The protests elicited widespread public support and the newly elected central government initiated a rehearing of the settlement based on the review filed by BGPMUS. The Supreme Court ordered the Madhya Pradesh government to pay a monthly sum of 200 rupees to 5,00,000 survivors for three years. Over the years, the organization organized several large scale demonstrations against faulty distribution of relief and inadequate medical care, attracting thousands of supporters. After a decade long struggle, the Supreme Court ordered the government to disburse a sum of 1,503 crore among the 5,70,000 victims.

The organization formed the major organized opposition to BJP's 1990 anti-encroachment drive in Bhopal emphasizing that the slum demolitions affected many victims of the gas leak. According to Jabbar, BGPMUS' legal intervention allowed 10,000 gas-affected families to stay where they were.

Jabbar is described as an old-school activist. His organization has little to zero online presence and Jabbar refused to give interviews in English, which limited their press coverage. He didn't take any foreign donations and used to rely solely on volunteer contributions. Jabbar had a paucity of funds and oftentimes his expenses were paid by his friends. He convened weekly meetings at the Yadgar-e-Shahjahani Park to keep the victims organized and memory of the tragedy alive. The organization was primarily funded by the monthly 5 rupee contributions of its members and the sale of embroidered clothes and stuffed toys made by the women.

== Awards and honours ==
The Government of India awarded him with Padma Shri in Social Work, posthumously in 2020. The Madhya Pradesh government conferred him with the state's highest award, Indira Gandhi Award for Social Service in 2019.
