= International Medical Commission on Bhopal =

The International Medical Commission on Bhopal (IMCB) was established in 1993 to organise medical responses to the 1984 Bhopal disaster (India).

== Background ==
The immediate scientific and medical response to the 1984 Bhopal disaster constituted a pulling together of hospitals, medical personnel and social services in the area. Coping with a disaster of this scale was unheard of anywhere in the world, and there was widespread admiration for those who responded, often risking their own lives in the process.

However, when the long term after effects began to appear, it was obvious that the social and legal climate was inadequate since there was little experience in dealing with a major environmental disaster. Scientific and medical personnel needed access to accident-related and toxicologic information to understand the causes and potential consequences of the disaster. Union Carbide, the primary repository of this information, faced with lawsuits and the prospect of bankruptcy, closed down its channels of communication. On the other hand, the extreme sensitivities of the local and national government bodies towards all aspects of the disaster, coupled with the lack of expertise and funds, resulted in an inadequate response on India's part to meet the urgent health care and social recovery needs of the community. Whereas local health professionals and the interested scientific community abroad expected a flood of information from a disaster of this magnitude, only a trickle resulted.

These transnational political and legal ramifications threw a veil of secrecy around the disaster and obstructed the discovery of vital medical and toxicologic information. The medical community was often frustrated in its attempts to understand the links between gas exposure and health and devise appropriate treatment strategies. As an example, ignorance about whether the main poison, methyl isocyanate, could decompose to deadly cyanide gas, led to years of acrimonious debate on the merits of treating the gas victims for cyanide poisoning.

Recognising the dire need of the gas victims, the Permanent Peoples' Tribunal met in 1992 and recommended that an international medical commission provide an in-depth independent assessment of the situation in Bhopal. In 1993, the Bhopal Group for Information and Action (BGIA) made a proposal. The International Medical Commission on Bhopal (IMCB) was thus constituted with 14 professionals from 12 countries who were chosen on the basis of their medical expertise and experience in environmental health, toxicology, neurology, immunology, respiratory medicine and family medicine. Drs. Rosalie Bertell and Gianni Tognoni served as the co-chairpersons of the IMCB. At the request of Carbide gas victim organisations, the IMCB conducted a humanitarian visit to India in January 1994 to contribute in any way possible to the relief of the victims and to suggest ways to in which such catastrophic accidents could be prevented in the future or their effects mitigated. During their stay, the IMCB met with government officials, various disaster experts, hospitals, research teams, local private physicians, biochemists, botanists, various survivor groups, environmental activists and veterinarians.

== Goals ==
The main goals of the IMCB were:

1. Betterment of the lives of the victims with rational diagnostic methods and treatment
2. Clarification of the place and form of international medical assistance and documentation after a catastrophic accident
3. Recommending legislation to protect humans from military and industrial pollution
4. Mobilisation of international assistance in response to the request of survivors rather than waiting for government invitation.
5. Provide guidelines for planning health research on the impact of major accidents
6. Establishment of a precedent for international protection for medical research against interference from conflicted corporations or governments
7. Legitimisation of the voices of survivor organisations and their participation in relevant decisions
8. Promoting ethical and scientific standards for information collection and communication to victims
9. Coordination of medical, research, and legal information to assist victims in claims
10. Alerting the Government of India to the need for full disclosure of potential hazards and environmental impact studies prior to allowing any hazardous industry to set up in India

The commissioners divided their work in various groups:

- Community & clinical studies: survey of the population followed by clinical testing of selected groups
- Assessment of availability and quality of medical care, including level of medical resources available.
- Examination of the adequacy and equity of laws and regulations relating to claims and the distribution of compensation;
- Evaluation of drug therapy by examination of prescriptions routinely given to survivors;
- Accident analysis;
- Review of studies and published literature on the disaster.

The IMCB committed itself to a) provide a full report of its findings and recommendations to the Governments of India and Madhya Pradesh, victims' organisations, and all other interested parties; b) stand ready to assist the government of India and medical colleagues to implement the recommendations of the commission; c) enlist the National Advisory Committee to follow up the initiatives of the commission; d) recommend research studies to be undertaken in India on the long-term effects of the gas exposure, and e) assure the wide circulation of its experience and findings in the professional literature.

== Findings ==
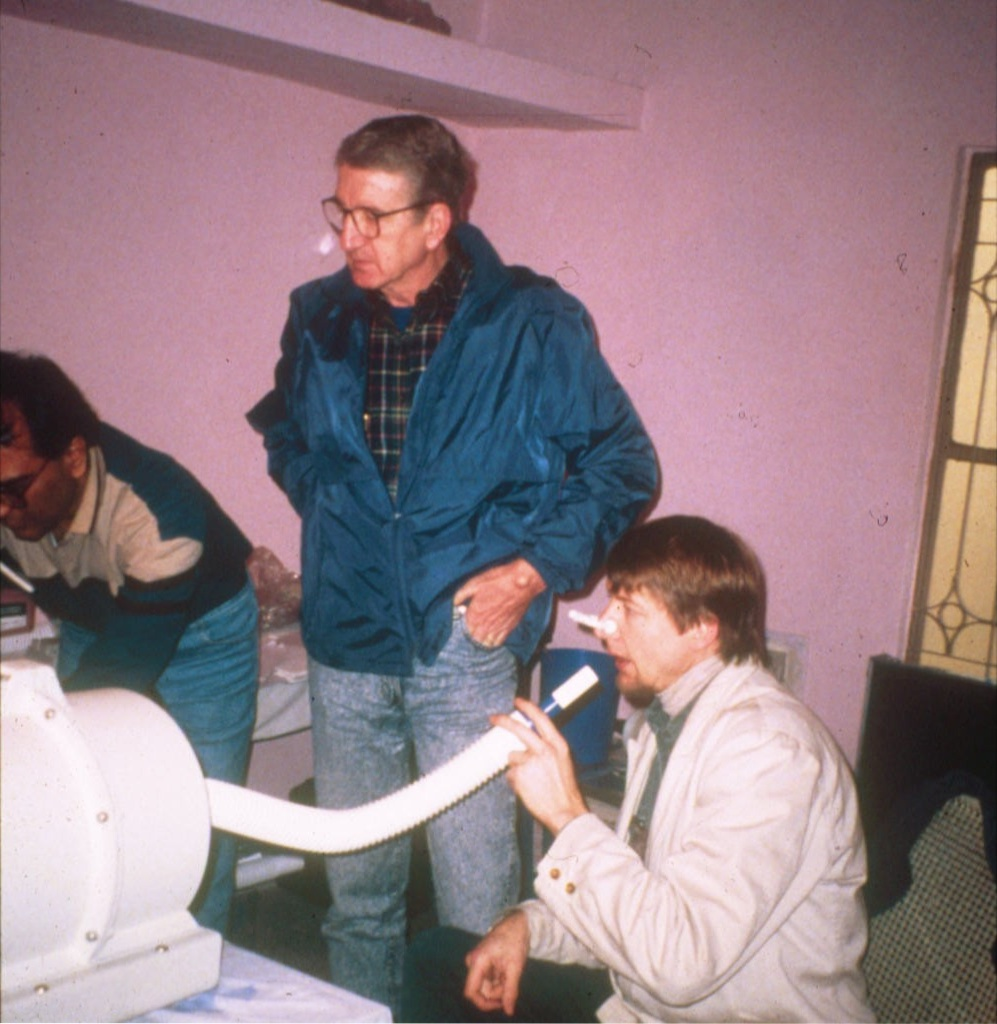
IMCB members (L to R) Ramana Dhara, Jerry Havens, Birger Heinzow calibrate a spirometer Jan 1994

=== Union Carbide ===
The IMCB publicly condemned Union Carbide and reiterated the company's full liability not only for responsibility in causing the deadly gas leak, but also for the confounding role of its behaviour with respect to pre-accident preventive and exposure mitigating efforts, and the timely and effective application of the appropriate medical measures at the time of the accident. This included the lack of transparency about the composition of the gases released, resulting in the absence of rational methods of care and planning resulting in loss of sight and in some cases life, and creation of suspicion and conflict among professionals and the population. There was also a lack of emergency preparation which would have made the public and professionals aware of the potential toxins inside the plant and how to respond to an accident.

=== Indian government ===
The government of India also was faulted since no clear guidelines were laid down to determine compensation to the victims resulting in undue delays and aggravation of their health status and/or economic survival. The secrecy surrounding the health studies undertaken by the Indian Council of Medical Research (ICMR) may initially have been instituted to protect the litigation process, but in reality made the rational medical treatment and establishment of claims almost impossible. In hindsight, it is clear that the secrecy served no purpose whatsoever and has resulted in non-publication of the information. Moreover, because of the secrecy about the accident itself and the chemicals released, it was difficult for the survivors to document their claims. The commission also noted an excessive fear among government personnel of bogus claims.

In fulfilling its commitment, results of the community studies conducted by the IMCB have been communicated to the affected population in the form of public meetings, which provided a forum for the victims to ask questions and provide comments. The studies have also been published in various national and international journals so that the scientific community has access to this information.

== Recommendations of the IMCB ==
The IMCB made the following recommendations:

1. Reorganisation of the health system to establish a network of community-based primary care clinics;
2. The gas-related disease categories need to be broadened to include central nervous system and psychological (PTD) injury;
3. A conference to determine best practice rehabilitation medicine, including both Western and Indian expertise, must be undertaken to develop rational treatments and prescription drugs for survivors.
4. Health data collected by the ICMR should be communicated to the population and submitted for publication in professional journals.
5. Gas victims to have the right of access to their medical records;
6. Victim organisations should be adequately represented in the national and state commissions dealing with the disaster;
7. Criteria for compensation should include medical, economic and social damage to the victims
8. Allocation of resources for economic and social rehabilitation of people and their communities should be made.
9. Thorough examination of the impact of the toxic waste buried on the Union Carbide site and its potential for further damage to public health needs to be researched.

=== Long-term effects ===
It is now well known that persistent and chronic gas-related health effects are present in the Bhopal population. However, the full spectrum of effects is yet to be defined, especially in those exposed as children or in utero, and as manifested in survivor reproductive health. There has been a lack of systematic collection of relevant information in these reproductive effects, and also with respect to cancer development or other chronic illnesses as sequelae of the gas exposure.

Recent investigations have shown that local well water has become contaminated by the improper storage of a large amount of hazardous waste in the facility, or on its grounds. This toxic waste is especially hazardous to those still suffering the effects of direct exposure to the gas.

As of 2007, the prospects for learning the sequelae of this disaster do not appear to be bright. What is sorely needed is an independent body to coordinate the health care, research, rehabilitation of gas victims, and care for potential effects in their offspring. Instead of the non-directive symptomatic medical treatment that currently exists, clear guidelines and criteria need to be formulated for specific medical conditions such as damage to bronchial tubes, sleep apnea, neuron destruction, etc. Such an effort could be implemented through India's existing health care pyramid. Community-level health units should be developed to serve a maximum of 5000 people each. Local hospitals with multiple departments can be used to provide secondary care. A specialised medical centre dedicated to treatment and research of the more serious problems arising from the gas leak should be established.

The IMCB believes it is a mistake to simply increase the number of hospital beds in Bhopal. The community has need for more neighbourhood clinics, non-drug respiratory therapy, clean air and water, and sheltered workshops, not for more hospital beds.

=== Need for long-term monitoring ===
The IMCB has recommended that long-term monitoring of the community for illness and response to treatment be done for several decades. This would include the study of exposed and unexposed areas to observe patterns of illness and death as well as to detect the occurrence of related chronic diseases and the appearance of new diseases. Such an approach needs to be one in which the health professionals involve the community of gas victims as active partners in investigation, provide them with feedback on community health, ensure that their health risks are properly communicated, and thereby enabling an increase in their consciousness, autonomy and self-determination.

Dhara and Acquilla critiqued aspects of post-disaster epidemiology which served as obstacles to the conduct of scientific and valid epidemiological investigation.

1. The original cohort of registered by the Indian Council of Medical research (ICMR) was chosen on the basis of health effects rather than any true measure of gas exposure. Instead, the cohort of 96,000 was selected based on severe, moderate, and mildly affected areas based on death rates. Prior versions of the technical report characterised the area as 'affected' but later versions contained confusing and contradictory terms such as 'exposed and affected', 'exposed but unaffected' and the term 'affected' was used interchangeably with 'exposed'. In epidemiological studies, it is well known that not all subjects in an exposed area are affected. As early as 1987, a dispersion model was available which delineated the exposed areas but was never used.
2. The selected cohort ratio was heavily skewed toward the severely affected area (75%) and such a selection would have introduced bias in the results and an incomplete understanding of the health effects in the population. The non-random cluster of deaths sample selection approach instead of randomised selection using a sampling frame had the potential for interviewer bias due to prior knowledge of potential health effects. Persons migrating out were excluded rather than treated as lost to follow-up thereby shrinking the sample size available for analysis.
3. Operational problems with such a large cohort included inadequate staffing and equipment – only 20 research assistants were available for monitoring the 96,000 person cohortiv and we estimate that one research assistants would have the herculean task of interviewing 40 families daily.
4. The six monthly morbidity and mortality prevalence data has not been consistently published since the cohort was formed. There may be some internal reports but these are not available to the wider scientific community or even the general public. Timely publication of epidemiological data is vital to understanding the spectrum of gas-related disease and provision of health services. ICMR's first comprehensive reports appeared more than twenty years after the disaster, thus rendering them merely an academic exercise.

The Bhopal medical community was faced with 1) the urgent health care needs of the affected community, 2) the non-availability of toxicological and accident-related information, 3) the extreme sensitivity of local and national government bodies toward all aspects of the disaster, 4) lack of expertise, and 5) the lack of funds available to independent researchers to conduct investigations. Faced with lawsuits and the prospect of bankruptcy, Union Carbide's efforts to keep open channels of communication were highly inadequate to address these issues and were considered by many to be a major human rights violation. In addition, the transnational political and legal ramifications served to throw a veil of secrecy around the disaster, thus impeding the discovery of essential pieces of information. Medical, toxicological, and accident-analysis data were not made public, thereby frustrating the efforts of the medical community to understand the linkage between exposures and health effects and devise appropriate treatment strategies. As an example, the lack of information about whether MIC could thermally decompose to hydrocyanic acid led to years of contentious debate on the merits of treating the gas victims for cyanide poisoning and an unfortunate violation of patient confidentiality.

Koplan et al. indicated that post-disaster epidemiologic studies should accurately estimate exposure to enable correct dose-response relationship modeling. These data are needed for a) identifying ill and exposed persons, b) determining long-term effects, and c) linking exposure and effects for use in litigation and to determine compensation. In the absence of the above modeling, studies on Bhopal victims will suffer from the limitation that the link between exposure and health effects cannot be easily made.

=== Working with other agencies ===
Recognising that Bhopal is a tragic model of an industrial epidemic, members of IMCB have expressed willingness to organise international teams when requested, to provide technical assistance and evaluation of other environmental disasters. Rather than the provision of emergency relief functions, for which there are other organisations such as Medecins sans Frontieres and the Red Cross/Red Crescent, the IMCB envisioned three levels:

1. response to communities who appeal on the basis of chronic disability due to a disaster, after its acute phase is over;
2. represent victims at the international level, for example, the World Health Agency, to recommend legislative changes required to implement the International Bill of Rights relevant to health and safety, and
3. working to define the appropriate public health investigations to serve the needs of the injured community rather than use the victim community to merely serve the needs of science.

The International Bill of Rights includes: The Universal Declaration of Human Rights, proclaimed on 10 Dec 1948; The International Covenant on Economic, Social, and Cultural Rights (1976), and the International Covenant on Civil and Political Rights, 1976.

The steps to be taken to achieve the full realisation of this right shall include:

- provision for the reduction of infant deaths and for healthy development of the child;
- improvement of all aspects of environmental and industrial hygiene;
- prevention, treatment, and control of epidemic, endemic, occupational and other diseases;
- creation of conditions which would assure to all people medical service and medical attention in the event of sickness,
- assuring the victims a living, work and social environment conducive to healing of its injuries.

To protect these rights, an international body, free of industry and government pressures, and competent to advise on health and safety standards, is required to be able to mediate just and equitable resolution and compensation of damage in the case of unanticipated disasters.

== Members of the IMCB ==
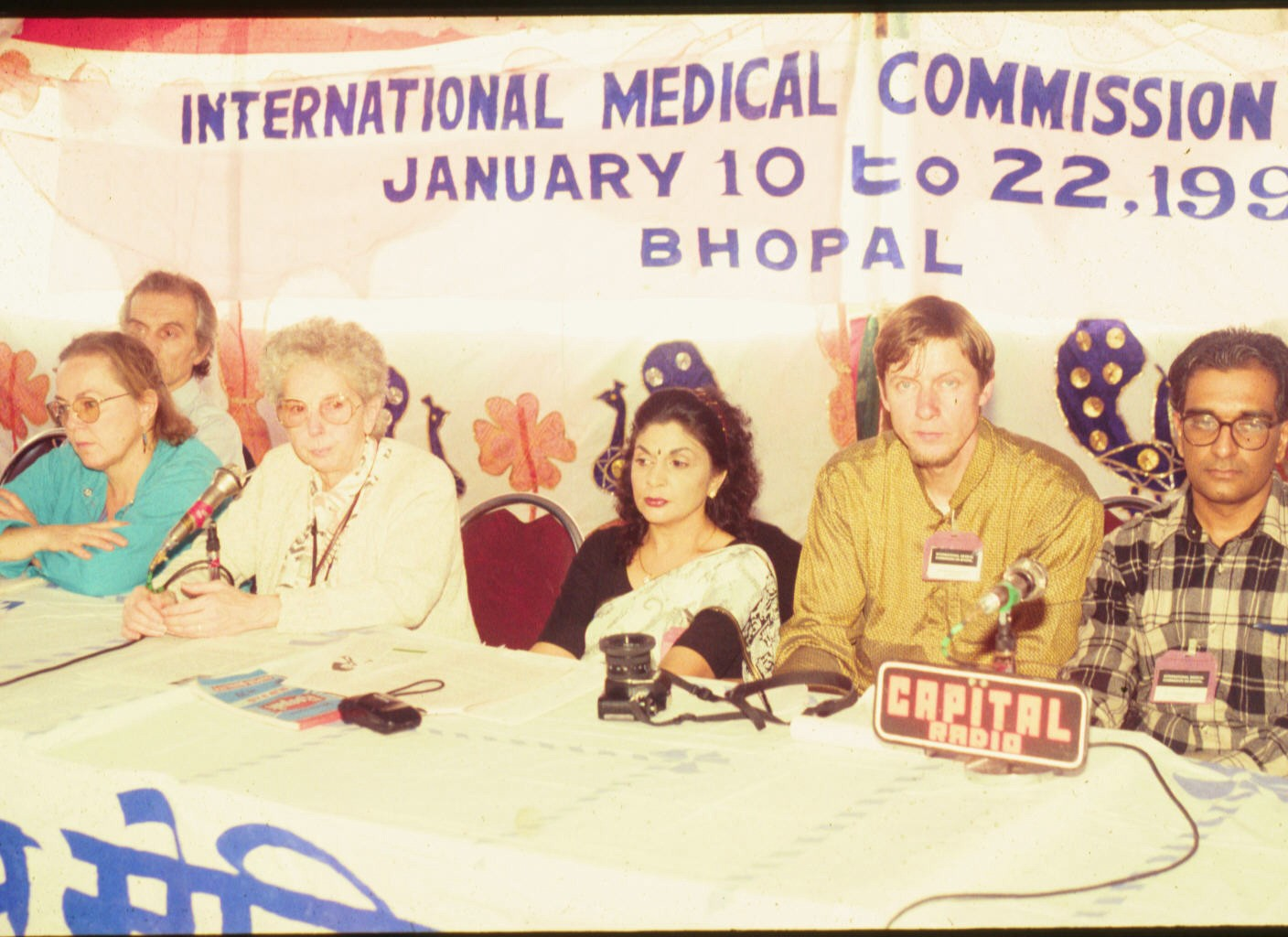
IMCB members (left to right) Drs. Gianni Tognoni, Ingrid Eckerman, Rosalie Bertell, Sushma Acquilla, Birger Heinzow and Ramana Dhara

- Rosalie Bertell (Canada),
- Gianni Tognoni (Italy)
- Thomas Callendar (USA)
- Jerry Havens (USA)
- V. Ramana Dhara (USA)
- Birger Heinzow (Germany)
- Marinus Verweij (Netherlands)
- Sushma Acquilla (UK)
- Paul Cullinan (UK)
- Wang Zhengang (China)
- Jerzy Jaskowski (Poland)
- Leonid Titov (Belarus)
- Ingrid Eckerman (Sweden),
- C. Sathyamala (India/UK)

== Carbide gas victims' organisations which worked with IMCB ==
- Bhopal Gas Peedit Mahila Stationery Karmachari Sangh
- Bhopal Gas Peedit Mahila Udyog Sanghatana
- Bhopal Group for Information & Action
- Nirashvrit Pension Bhogi Karmachari Sangh
- Zahreeli Gas Kand Sangharsh Morcha
- Bhopal Gas Peedith Sangharsh Sahayog Samiti

== Continuing Bhopal-type disasters in India ==
Data from the National Disaster Management Agency (NDMA) show that 130 significant chemical accidents occurred in the last decade. The accidents resulted in 259 deaths and 563 major injuries. Almost 38 years after Bhopal, accidents continue to occur in the small, medium, and large-scale industries in the public, private, and transnational corporation sectors.

Numerous environmental laws, and state and national disaster management agencies were created, with thousands of people being trained in environmental protection. The recurring accidents, though, indicate that industrial safety and protection of the occupational health of its labor force is still wanting. To correct the imbalance of power between citizens and corporations, the IMCB has recommended that vital stakeholders like citizen bodies be represented in the local, state, and national agencies dealing with disasters. Victims should be compensated for medical, economic, and social harm, and communities should be rehabilitated from the damage caused.

== Publications of the IMCB members ==
- Multiple articles in International Perspectives in Public Health; 1996; Vols 11&12. International Institute of Concern for Public Health.
- Acquilla, S; Bertell, R; Dhara, V; Tognoni, G (2005). "Aftermath of the world's worst chemical disasterBhopal, December 1984" (PDF). Journal of Loss Prevention in the Process Industries. 18 (4–6): 268–273. doi:10.1016/j.jlp.2005.06.008.
- Acquilla SD, Bertell R, Cullinan P, Dhara VR, Heinzow B, Tognoni G, Verweij M (4 August 2010). "Bhopal disaster and the BP oil spill". The Hindu. Archived from the original on 7 August 2010.
- Cullinan P, Acquilla SD, Dhara VR (1996). "Long term morbidity in survivors of the 1984 Bhopal gas leak". The National Medical Journal of India. 9 (1): 5–10. PMID 8713516.
- Cullinan P, Acquilla S, Dhara VR (February 1997). "Respiratory morbidity 10 years after the Union Carbide gas leak at Bhopal: a cross sectional survey. The International Medical Commission on Bhopal". BMJ. 314 (7077): 338–42. doi:10.1136/bmj.314.7077.338. PMC 2125830. PMID 9040323.
- Dhara, V. R (2004). "Assessing Exposure to Toxic Gases in Bhopal". JAMA. 291 (4): 422, author reply 422–3. doi:10.1001/jama.291.4.422-a. PMID 14747494. S2CID 45476034.
- Dhara VR, Dhara R, Acquilla SD, Cullinan P (May 2002). "Personal exposure and long-term health effects in survivors of the union carbide disaster at bhopal". Environmental Health Perspectives. 110 (5): 487–500. doi:10.1289/ehp.02110487. PMC 1240837. PMID 12003752. Archived from the original on 2 June 2010.
- Dhara, V. Ramana; Dhara, Rosaline (2002). "The Union Carbide Disaster in Bhopal: A Review of Health Effects". Archives of Environmental Health. 57 (5): 391–404. doi:10.1080/00039890209601427. PMID 12641179. S2CID 20233497.
- Dhara, Rosaline; Dhara, V. Ramana (2013). "Bhopal—A Case Study of International Disaster". International Journal of Occupational and Environmental Health. 1 (1): 58–69. doi:10.1179/oeh.1995.1.1.58. PMID 9990159.
- Dhara V. Ramana. The Bhopal Gas Leak: Lessons from studying the impact of a disaster in a developing nation. Doctoral thesis-Univ. of Massachusetts Lowell. 2000.
- Dhara VR (2002). "What ails the Bhopal disaster investigations? (And is there a cure?)". International Journal of Occupational and Environmental Health. 8 (4): 371–9. doi:10.1179/107735202800338605. PMID 12412856. S2CID 5636182.
- Dhara V.R, Gassert TH. The Bhopal Syndrome:persistent questions on toxicity & management. IJOEH 2002;8:380–386
- Dhara VR (2012). "Vignettes of the Bhopal Disaster (poem)". Online Journal of Health Ethics. 8 (2): 1–3. doi:10.18785/ojhe.0802.07.
- Dhara VR & Acquilla S. Correspondence on 2012 Bhopal lung function study in Indian Journal Medical Research. Dec 2012. Response by De, S. http://www.icmr.nic.in/ijmr/2012/december/Correspondence.pdf
- Dhara VR & Acquilla S. Further observations on post-disaster epidemiology in Indian Journal Medical Research. Aug 2013. http://icmr.nic.in/ijmr/2013/august/0816.pdf
- Dhara VR. Six Blind Men & The Elephant: Healing Bhopal. TEDMED @ Centers for Disease Control & Prevention, Atlanta, GA, USA; Sep 2013. https://www.youtube.com/watch?v=SQ4Qbx8czfc
- Eckerman I (1996). "The Health Situation of Women and Children in Bhopal. Report for The International Medical Commission on Bhopal". International Perspectives in Public Health. 11–12: 29–36.
- Eckerman I (1995). Long-term Health Effects of Exposure to the Bhopal Gases. Observations of the Hazardous Effects on the Health of Particularly Vulnerable Groups. Gothenburg: Nordic School of Public Health. Mfsrep.Int:4,1995
- Eckerman I (2001). Chemical Industry and Public Health – Bhopal as an example (PDF). Gothenburg: Nordic School of Public Health. Archived from the original (PDF) on 30 October 2012. MPH 2001:24
- Eckerman I (2005). The Bhopal Saga – Causes and Consequences of the World's Largest Industrial Disaster. India: Universities Press. doi:10.13140/2.1.3457.5364. ISBN 81-7371-515-7.
- Eckerman, I (2005). "The Bhopal gas leak: Analyses of causes and consequences by three different models". Journal of Loss Prevention in the Process Industries. 18 (4–6): 213–217. doi:10.1016/j.jlp.2005.07.007.
- Eckerman I (2006). "The Bhopal Disaster 1984 – working conditions and the role of the trade unions" (PDF). Asian Pacific Newsletter on Occupational Health and Safety. 13: 48–49. Archived from the original (PDF) on 16 July 2011.
- Eckerman, I (2011). "Bhopal Gas Catastrophe 1984: Causes and Consequences". Encyclopedia of Environmental Health. Amsterdam: Elsevier B.V. pp. 302–16. doi:10.1016/B978-0-444-52272-6.00359-7. ISBN 978-0-444-52272-6.
- Eckerman, I (2013). "Bhopal Gas Catastrophe 1984: Causes and Consequences". Reference Module in Earth Systems and Environmental Sciences. pp. 272–287. doi:10.1016/B978-0-12-409548-9.01903-5. ISBN 978-0-12-409548-9.
- Eckerman, Ingrid; Boersen, Tom (2018). "Corporate and Governmental Responsibilities for Preventing Chemical Disasters: Lessons from Bhopal". Hyle: International Journal for Philosophy of Chemistry. 24: 29–53.
- Eckerman, I; Boersen, Tom (2021). "Corporate and Governmental Responsibilities for Preventing Chemical Disasters: Lessons from Bhopal". Ethics of chemistry. From poison gas to climate engineering. Singapore: World Scientific Publishing Co. pp. 113–140. doi:10.1142/12189. ISBN 978-981-123-353-1. S2CID 233837382.
- Havens, Jerry; Walker, Heather; Spicer, Tom (2012). "Bhopal atmospheric dispersion revisited". Journal of Hazardous Materials. 233–234: 33–40. doi:10.1016/j.jhazmat.2012.06.055. PMID 22819479.
- Svendsen, Erik R; Runkle, Jennifer R; Dhara, Venkata Ramana; Lin, Shao; Naboka, Marina; Mousseau, Timothy A; Bennett, Charles L (2012). "Epidemiologic Methods Lessons Learned from Environmental Public Health Disasters: Chernobyl, the World Trade Center, Bhopal, and Graniteville, South Carolina". International Journal of Environmental Research and Public Health. 9 (8): 2894–909. doi:10.3390/ijerph9082894. PMC 3447594. PMID 23066404.

== Publications of other authors ==
- Bhopal Group for Information and Action (BGIA). Letter July 16, 1993
- "The Bhopal gas tragedy: Evidence for cyanide poisoning not convincing" (PDF). Current Science. 89 (6): 923–5. September 2005. Archived from the original (PDF) on 30 October 2008.
- Sriramachari S (April 2004). "The Bhopal gas tragedy: An environmental disaster" (PDF). Current Science. 86 (7): 905–20. Archived from the original (PDF) on 30 October 2008.
- Ranjan, N (2003). "Methyl Isocyanate Exposure and Growth Patterns of Adolescents in Bhopal". JAMA. 290 (14): 1856–7. doi:10.1001/jama.290.14.1856. PMID 14532313.
- Health Effects of the toxic gas leak from the Union Carbide methyl isocyanate plant in Bhopal. Indian Council of Medical Research. Technical report on population based long term epidemiological studies (1996-2010);2013. https://webdrive.service.emory.edu/users/vdhara/www.BhopalPublications/Health%20Effects%20&%20Epidemiology/Bhopal%20ICMR%202013%20tech%20report%201996-2010.pdf
- Murthy RS (July–December 2014). "Mental health of survivors of 1984 Bhopal disaster: A continuing challenge". Industrial Psychiatry Journal. 23 (2): 86–93. doi:10.4103/0972-6748.151668. PMC 4361985. PMID 25788796.
- Lucchini RG, Dana H, Acquilla S, et al. (2017). "A comparative assessment of major international disasters: the need for exposure assessment, systematic emergency preparedness, and lifetime health care". BMC Public Health. 17 (1) 46: 46. doi:10.1186/s12889-016-3939-3. PMC 5219808. PMID 28061835.

== Media ==
- Dhara VR. Six Blind Men & The Elephant: Healing Bhopal. TEDMED @ Centers for Disease Control & Prevention, Atlanta, GA, USA; Sep 2013. https://www.youtube.com/watch?v=SQ4Qbx8czfc
- Acquilla SD; Bertell R; Cullinan P; Dhara VR; Heinzow B; Tognoni G; Verweij M (4 August 2010). "Bhopal disaster and the BP oil spill". The Hindu. Archived from the original on 7 August 2010.
