= Amulya Malladi =

Indian writer

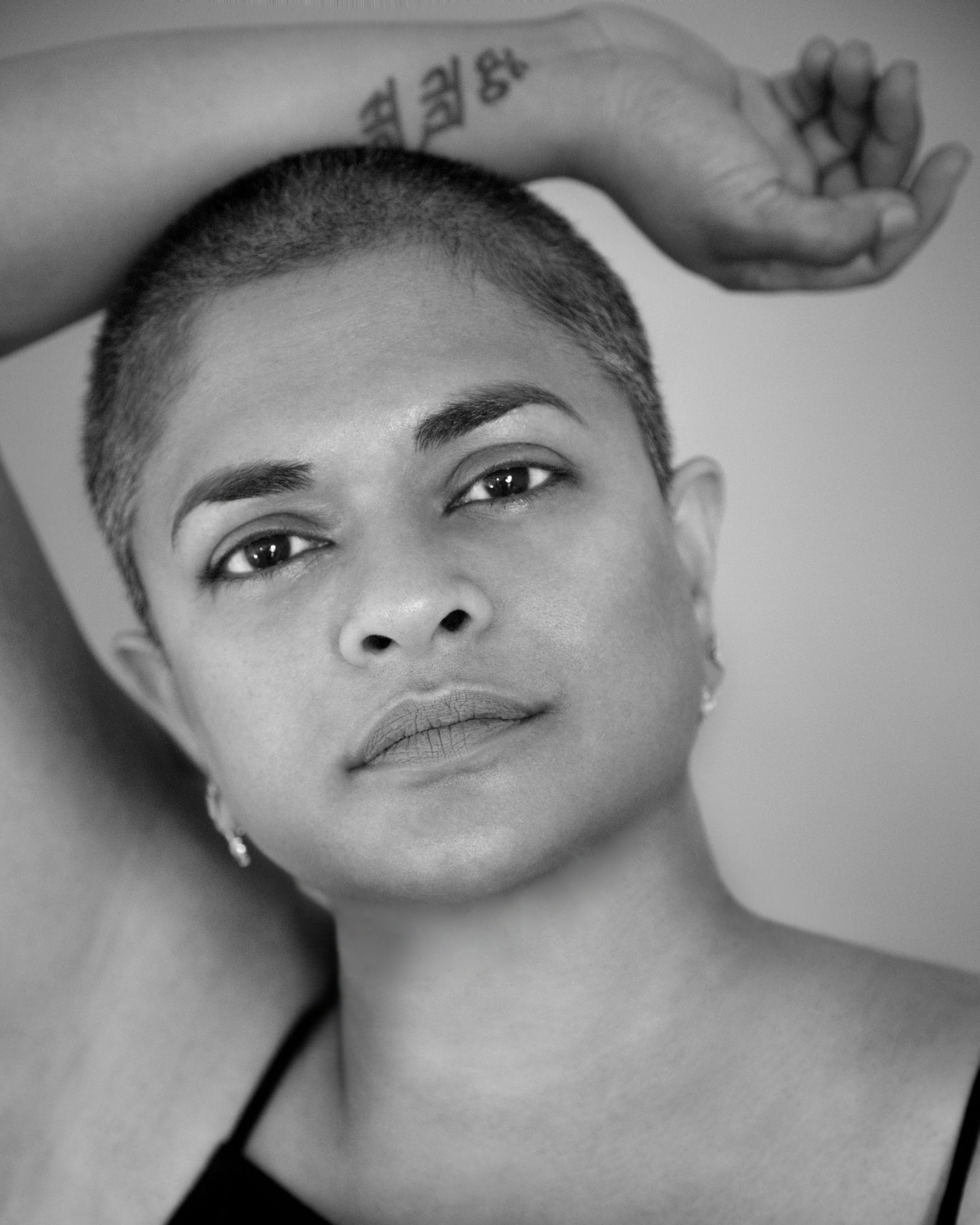
- [1]
- Born: Sagar, India
- Occupations: Writer, marketing executive
- Writing career
- Period: 2002 to present
- Genres: Literary fiction, women's fiction
- Notable awards: Outstanding Writing for the Studio+ drama web series Ø
- Website: www.amulyamalladi.com

Amulya Malladi (born 1974 in Sagar, Madhya Pradesh, India) is an author. She earned her bachelor's degree in electronics engineering from Osmania University, Hyderabad, India and her master's degree in journalism from the University of Memphis, Tennessee, United States.

After graduating from the University of Memphis, she lived and worked in Silicon Valley. She is the author of nine novels, including A House for Happy Mothers. Her books have been translated into several languages, including Dutch, German, Spanish, Danish, Romanian, Serbian, and Tamil. She has a master's degree in journalism from the University of Memphis and a bachelor's degree in engineering from Osmania University. When she's not writing, she works as a marketing executive for a global life sciences company. Amulya lives with her family in Los Angeles Her latest novel, a Nordic thriller, “A Death in Denmark” was released in March 2023 by William Morrow.

== Early life ==
Amulya Malladi was born in 1974 in a small town called Sagar, in the central Indian state of Madhya Pradesh. Due to Malladi's father's occupation in the Indian Army, Amulya lived all over the country ranging from the Himalayan foothills to the southern city of Madras.

At the age of 11, when she found herself immersed in a world of goblins, pixies and fairies in the works of Enid Blyton, she wrote her first handwritten book of 50 pages. She once said that her affection and affinity towards writing influenced her academic choices. Though she first earned her bachelor's degree in electrical and electronics engineering from Osmania University, Hyderabad, India, she followed it up with a master's degree in journalism from University of Memphis in Tennessee. After gaining the journalism degree, she worked as a copy writer and a marketing manager for a software company in Silicon Valley, California.

Malladi currently resides in Los Angeles with her family. She has said that "When I first moved to Denmark ... Danish sounded to me like the buzzing of bees".

== A Breath of Fresh Air (2002) ==
In an interview, she spoke about the influences behind her first book, A Breath of Fresh Air (2002). While she was nine years old, her family was living in the Indian city of Bhopal because her father was posted in the Corps of Electrical and Mechanical Engineers. During that time, on the night of 3 December 1984, methyl isocyanate gas leaked from Bhopal's Union Carbide plant that killed many people. When this gas tragedy occurred, her family and she were staying at the Army Center which was a few kilometers away from the plant. Due to the wind that blew in a direction opposite to theirs, they remained unaffected by the gas leak. However, she remembered how those affected described the methyl isocyanate gas as chili powder in their lungs. These images stayed with her and took the form of a story, which she wanted to tell but had no idea how to. While living in Utah, the writing process for her first novel began.

SF Weekly wrote in its review about this book:

Amulya Malladi's gemlike first novel has a provocative, almost absurd concept. Built on too-familiar notions about womanhood, fidelity, and family ... But, the quality of Malladi's writing elevates Fresh Air well above standard-issue book-club fodder, and her strong control over plot helps her avoid the overwritten narrative drift that plagues most first novels. The prose ... is economical, more Raymond Carver than Bharati Mukherjee. Plainly told, Malladi's story is a fine study of the tenuous control we have over love and memory.

A review from the Time magazine said:

Malladi's subject is ... compelling the survivors of the Bhopal tragedy remain neglected and angry after 18 years. [Malladi] was a child in Bhopal when the disaster happened and wasn't affected because her house was upwind of the Carbide factory. The victims of the accident now total 14,000, a number Malladi humanizes by keeping her story intimate.

== The Mango Season (2003) ==
As to how Malladi came up with the title and names of the characters from The Mango Season, she said in an interview that unless she has a title of the book she is writing, she cannot move on. Same is the case with the names of her characters from her works of literature. Most of the influences on her characters came from her Hyderabad connection, which she corroborated by saying, "I think it's easier to write about a place you've lived in. The research element definitely shrinks and you can write more confidently. I also feel I have an obligation to write about a place I've lived in. I have moved a lot in my life, as a child and even as an adult, and I just feel that it would be such a waste if I wouldn't write about the places I have lived in." She said that writing this book was like taking a trip to Hyderabad.

A review from the Santa Monica Mirror said:

Amulya Malladi lays India out like a living picture before her readers. The smells curl out through the spine of the book, the tastes leave our throats burning with an unknown spice. The heat causes sweat to run down our backs, the curious sounds block the more familiar ones of cars and traffic from our ears.

== Serving Crazy with Curry (2004) ==
After losing her Silicon Valley job and a baby, and facing familial pressure to marry and be a traditional Indian wife, Devi attempts suicide, but even that is unsuccessful. After being found by her mother, she moves back in with her parents to recover, but refuses to speak, choosing to communicate instead through food. Her "crazy" concoctions bring the family together, but secrets still lurk in the background. Serving Crazy with Curry received a starred review from the Library Journal.

== Song of the Cuckoo Bird (2005) ==
Kokila, an eleven-year-old orphan, is promised in marriage, when a trip to the Tella Meda ashram in southern India changes everything. Choosing to stay at Tella Meda rather than be married at such a young age, she forms a new family with the other women who reside there.

== The Sound of Language (2007) ==
After her husband was taken prisoner by the Taliban, Raihana escapes from war-torn Kabul and settles with distant relatives in Denmark. She enrolls in school but struggles to learn Danish, and so apprentices herself to Gunnar, a beekeeper and recent widower. As they become friends, they face pressure and disapproval from their respective communities; Raihana is expected to remarry, and should not be spending time alone with a Danish man.

== A House for Happy Mothers (2016) ==
After three miscarriages, Silicon Valley residents Priya and Madhu make one more attempt at parenthood, this time via a surrogate in Madhu's native India. The surrogate, Asha, already has two children, but is lacking in everything else. Searching for a way to secure a good future for her gifted son, she reluctantly agrees to carry Priya and Madhu's baby inside her. While Priya's choices are questioned by her family and friends in the United States, Asha must hide her pregnancy for fear of societal shaming, residing in the Happy Mother's House away from her family for most of her pregnancy. A House for Happy Mother's received a starred review from Booklist, who said it "examines India's surrogacy industry with honesty and grace."

== The Copenhagen Affair (2017) ==
After suffering a nervous breakdown at work and a year of depression, Sanya is in a sad state. Her husband, Harry, decides that a move to Copenhagen to pursue a business deal might help pull her out of her funk. As Sanya explores this new city and mingles with the Danish elite, she realizes that the "Old Sanya" is gone, but isn't quite sure who the "New Sanya" is yet. Booklist called it an "entertaining romp through Denmark."

== Bibliography ==
- A Death in Denmark, William Morrow (2023) ISBN 978-0063235519
- A Breath of Fresh Air, Penguin Books (2002) ISBN 978-0345450296
- The Mango Season, Ballantine Books (2003) ISBN 978-0345450319
- Serving Crazy with Curry, Ballantine Books (2004) ISBN 1092925333, 978-1092925334
- Song of the Cuckoo Bird, Ballantine Books (2005) ISBN 978-0345483157
- The Sound of Language, Ballantine Books (2007) ISBN 978-0307491152
- A House for Happy Mothers, Amazon Lake Union (2016) ISBN 978-1683242987
- The Copenhagen Affair, Amazon Lake Union (2017) ISBN 978-1503940314
- The Nearest Exit May Be Behind You (2019) ISBN 978-1096250784

== See also ==
- QBD Crime TV Interview
- Thoughts From a Page Podcast
- Shondaland: Amulya Malladi’s ‘A Death in Denmark’ Draws Parallels Between World War II and the Present Day
- Something Rotten in Denmark: PW Talks with Amulya Malladi
- List of Indian writers
- Crime Fiction Lover: A Death in Denmark
- NovelsAlive: 5-STAR REVIEW: A DEATH IN DENMARK by Amulya Malladi
- Books by Amulya Malladi on Publishers Weekly
- An Interview with Amulya at JaggeryList
- 4 Questions with Amulya Malladi
