= Anna Murray =

Anna Murray may refer to:

- Anna Murray Douglass, American abolitionist and member of the Underground Railroad
- Anna Evans Murray, American civic leader, educator, and early advocate of free kindergarten
- Pauli Murray (Anna Pauline Murray), American civil rights activist

== See also ==
- Anna Murray Vail, American botanist
- Anne Murray (disambiguation)
