= Ludhiana gas leak =

Fatal incident in Punjab, India

- Date: 30 April 2023
- Location: Ludhiana, Punjab, India
- Type: Gas leak
- Deaths: 11
- Injuries: 9

On 30 April 2023, eleven people were killed and nine others were hospitalised when a gas leak occurred in Ludhiana, Punjab, India. The incident left several others unconscious in their homes.

== Cause ==
The official source of the leak is yet to be confirmed. A National Disaster Response Force team along with experts reached the site to determine the cause and source of the leak. According to Punjab Chief Minister Bhagwant Mann, the leak was from a factory. According to The Tribune newspaper, the district administration released a statement stating that high levels of hydrogen sulphide gas were detected in the area. One official had speculated that the gas may have spread from manholes. Ludhiana Deputy Commissioner Surabhi Malik was quoted by the PTI news agency as saying that samples would be collected from manholes, adding that it was possible that some chemical had reacted with methane in the manholes.

== Aftermath ==
Following reports of breathing difficulties, the authorities evacuated the area and sealed it off. Four individuals received medical treatment at the hospital. A ₹200,000 compensation each for the family of those dead and ₹50,000 each for those injured in the incident was announced by the district administration.

An investigative report delivered on 4 July 2023 did not find any individual or organization directly responsible.
