= Warren Anderson (American businessman) =

American businessman (1921–2014)

- Anderson in the 1980s
- Born: Warren Martin Anderson; November 29, 1921; New York City, U.S.
- Died: September 29, 2014 (aged 92); Vero Beach, Florida, U.S.
- Education: Colgate University
- Occupation: Businessman
- Known for: Chair and CEO of Union Carbide Corporation during the Bhopal disaster
- Spouse: Lillian Anderson

Warren Martin Anderson (November 29, 1921 – September 29, 2014) was an American businessman who was the chair and CEO of the Union Carbide Corporation at the time of the Bhopal disaster in 1984. In 1989, Union Carbide paid $479 million to the Indian government (equivalent to $1.21 billion in 2025) to settle litigation stemming from the disaster.

== Personal life ==
Anderson was born in 1921 in the Bay Ridge section of Brooklyn, New York, to Swedish immigrants. He was named after the American president Warren Harding. He later attended the naval pre-flight school in Chapel Hill, North Carolina. He married Lillian Anderson. They lived in Bridgehampton, Long Island, New York, and owned houses in Vero Beach, Florida, and Greenwich, Connecticut. He died at a nursing home in Vero Beach, Florida, on September 29, 2014.

== Bhopal disaster ==
The Bhopal disaster took place in a plant belonging to Union Carbide's Indian subsidiary, Union Carbide India Limited, in the city of Bhopal, Madhya Pradesh, India, on the night of December 2–3, 1984. Thousands of people died and hundreds of thousands more were injured in the disaster. He flew to India and was promptly placed in custody by Indian authorities, but was allowed to return to the United States.

He was declared a fugitive from justice by the Chief Judicial Magistrate, Gulab Sharma, of Bhopal on February 1, 1992, for failing to appear at the court hearings in a culpable homicide case. A formal extradition request was issued in 2003. The United States declined to extradite him citing a lack of evidence. The chief judicial magistrate of Bhopal issued an arrest warrant for Anderson on July 31, 2009.

In August 2009, a Union Carbide spokesperson said that the company had no role in operating the plant at the time as the factory was owned, managed and operated by employees of Union Carbide India Limited. Eight former senior employees of the subsidiary were found guilty on June 7, 2010. After these convictions, a Union Carbide spokesperson said, "All the appropriate people from UCIL – officers and those who actually ran the plant on a daily basis – have appeared to face charges."
