= Annie Murray (writer) =

English novelist

- Education: St. John's College, Oxford
- Occupation: Writer
- Writing career
- Language: English
- Genre: Regional historical
- Notable awards: Romantic Historical Novel of the Year Award Best Novel nominee (2008); SHE/Granada TV Short Story Competition (1991)

Annie Murray is an English writer, best known for series about women and children in war time and for her bestselling novels featuring the Cadbury factory in Bournville, Birmingham's Jewellery Quarter and many others. Her novel, Where Earth Meets Sky (2007), was nominated for Romantic Historical Novel of the Year by the Romantic Novelists Association. Her latest novel, The Pearl Button Girl , was published in 2025.

== Biography ==
Annie Murray is an English writer whose first work, Birmingham Rose, was published in 1995. Raised an only child, she read English at St. John's College, Oxford. Murray was training to be a nurse when raising children inspired her to pursue writing instead and early in her career, Murray won the SHE/Granada TV Short Story Competition (1991). Murray has four children and lives near Oxford, United Kingdom. Murray belongs to the Tindal Street Fiction Group in Birmingham. Murray is also a Trustee of the Bhopal Medical Appeal.

== Works ==
Birmingham Series

- Birmingham Blitz (1998)
- Birmingham Friends (aka Kate and Olivia) (1998)
- Birmingham Rose (1995)

Chocolate Girls Series

- Chocolate Girls (2003)
- The Bells of Bournville Green (2008)

Hopscotch Summer Series

- A Hopscotch Summer (2009)
- Soldier Girl (2010)
- All the Days of our Lives (2011)

Narrowboat Girl Series

- The Narrowboat Girl (2001)
- Water Gypsies (2004)

Other Works

- A Wartime Secret (2017)
- Christmas Fireside Stories: A Collection (2014)
- The Doorstep Child (2017)
- Family of Women (2006)
- Meet me under the Clock (2014)
- Miss Purdy's Class (2005)
- My Daughter, My Mother (2012)
- Now the War is Over (2016)
- Orphan of Angel Street (1999)
- Papa Georgio (2012)
- The Pearl Button Girl (2025)
- Poppy Day (2000)
- Sisters of Gold (2018)
- War Babies (2015)
- Where Earth Meets Sky (2007)
- The Women of Lilac Street (2015)
