= NBC Radio Network =

American radio network (1926–1999)

- Type: Radio network
- Country: United States

Ownership
- Owner: General Electric (RCA); (1926–1928); RCA (1928–1986); General Electric (1986–1987); Westwood One (1987–1999)
- Key people: David Sarnoff (founder)

History
- Launch date: November 15, 1926 (100 years ago)
- Replaced: "WEAF chain" (AT&T; d/b/a the Broadcasting Company of America)
- Closed: April 17, 1999; (27 years ago)
- Replaced by: Westwood One; NBC News Radio
- Former names: NBC Red Network (1927–1942)

Coverage
- Availability: National, through regional affiliates

The National Broadcasting Company's NBC Radio Network (also known as the NBC Red Network from 1927 to 1942) (Note: The phrase "red network" was used in press and promotional coverage starting in 1927; the network itself was not formally named "NBC Red" until 1936.) was an American commercial radio network which was in continuous operation from 1926 through 1999. Along with the NBC Blue Network, it was one of the first two nationwide networks established in the United States. Its major competitors were the Columbia Broadcasting System (CBS), founded in 1927, and the Mutual Broadcasting System, founded in 1934. In 1942, NBC was required to divest one of its national networks and so it sold NBC Blue, which was soon renamed the American Broadcasting Company (ABC). After this separation, the Red Network continued as the NBC Radio Network.

For the first 61 years of its existence, NBC was owned by the Radio Corporation of America (RCA) with New York City radio station WEAF (renamed WNBC in 1946, WRCA in 1954 and again as WNBC in 1960) as its flagship station. Following the emergence of television as the dominant entertainment medium and much of NBC Radio's talent migrating both to CBS and NBC television, the network made multiple investments in programming in hopes of retaining relevance. These included the weekend program umbrella Monitor (1955–1975), the all-news focused NBC News and Information Service (1975–1977) and the talk radio service NBC Talknet, all of which encountered varying degrees of success and failure.

Following General Electric's purchase of RCA in late 1986, GE sold the NBC Radio Network to Westwood One in 1987. Westwood One had acquired Mutual in 1985 and gradually, the operations of both networks were combined. NBC Radio News, which was also folded into Mutual's news operations, saw most of its functions cease on April 17, 1999, when the Mutual name was retired and both Mutual and NBC were absorbed into CBS's radio news operations. Westwood One and its successor network continued to use "NBC" branding for some of its programming until 2020, partnering with NBC News to operate NBC News Radio from 2003 until 2014, and with NBC Sports for NBC Sports Radio. From 2016 onward, iHeartMedia has handled production and distribution of NBC News Radio.

== Early history ==
=== WEAF chain ===
The 1926 formation of the National Broadcasting Company (NBC) was a consolidation and reorganization of earlier network radio operations developed by the American Telephone & Telegraph Company (AT&T) beginning in 1922, in addition to more limited efforts conducted by the "radio group" companies, which consisted of the Radio Corporation of America (RCA) and its corporate owners, General Electric (GE) and the Westinghouse Electric & Manufacturing Company (and, for a period of time, the United Fruit Company).

Organized radio broadcasting started in the early 1920s, with AT&T soon becoming an industry leader. In 1920 and 1921, AT&T concluded a series of patent cross-licensing agreements with the "radio group" companies. The "radio group" began negotiating under that name through a cross-licensing agreement between GE and Westinghouse, agreed to on July 1, 1921. Under these agreements, AT&T asserted that it held the sole right to sell commercial time on radio stations, which it called "toll broadcasting", although for the next few years the idea of radio advertising remained controversial. AT&T also recognized that its longline telephone network could be used to connect radio stations together to form networks to share programming and costs.

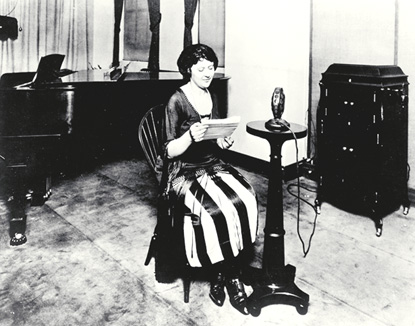
The Eveready Hour announcer Helen Hahn in the WEAF studios, c. 1922

In early 1922, AT&T announced the establishment of a "toll" station in New York City and its intention to develop a nationwide commercial radio network using their Bell System infrastructure. The original plan for the "toll" station was to offer the station for leasing to different operators for fees based on the length of airtime and the specific daypart. Out of the two New York City stations AT&T set up, WEAF emerged as the more successful and served as the key station for AT&T's network development. Although the original plan was to build additional stations throughout the United States, the "broadcasting boom" of 1922 resulted in a total of over 500 assorted broadcasting stations by the end of the year, so AT&T only found it necessary to build one additional outlet, WCAP in Washington, D.C., owned by its Chesapeake & Potomac subsidiary.

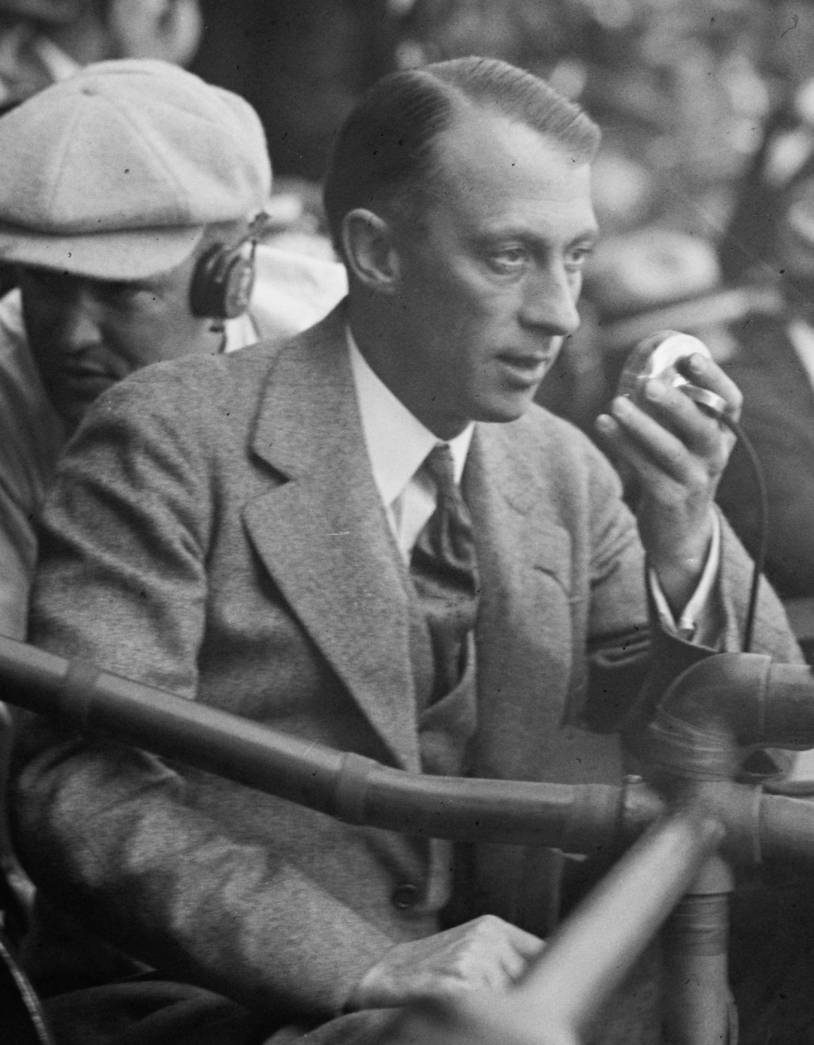
WEAF announcer Graham McNamee calling the 1924 World Series for the "WEAF chain"

AT&T's radio network, commonly called the "WEAF chain", was first developed in the northeastern United States. The first joint broadcast was a one-time effort made on January 4, 1923, when a program WEAF originated was relayed by WNAC in Boston, Massachusetts. The first continuous link was established on July 1, 1923, when Colonel Edward H. R. Green arranged for AT&T to provide WEAF programming for rebroadcast by his station, WMAF at South Dartmouth, Massachusetts. The first transcontinental link was made in early 1924, and that fall a coast-to-coast network of 23 stations broadcast a speech by President Calvin Coolidge. By the end of 1925, there were 26 affiliates in the standard "WEAF chain", extending west to St. Louis and Kansas City, Missouri.

One early success for the "WEAF chain" was The Eveready Hour, the first sponsored program to be broadcast over a radio network, paid for by the National Carbon Company. Debuting over WEAF in December 1923, the program quickly grew in popularity; unlike most sponsored programs which typically featured music from a dance orchestra, it is credited as the first variety program and the first to utilize scripts and dress rehearsals prior to broadcast. The Eveready Hour's installment on November 4, 1924, was notably interspersed with election returns read by WEAF's Graham McNamee and aired over the WEAF chain until "long after midnight". McNamee already had made another first for the "WEAF chain" one month earlier, calling play-by-play of the 1924 World Series over an eight-station hookup.

On May 11, 1926, AT&T centralized its radio operations into a new subsidiary known as the Broadcasting Company of America. Although not widely known at the time, this was done in anticipation of selling the radio network, the result of a management decision that the radio operations were incompatible with the company's primary role as the leading U.S. supplier of telephone services.

=== WJZ chain ===
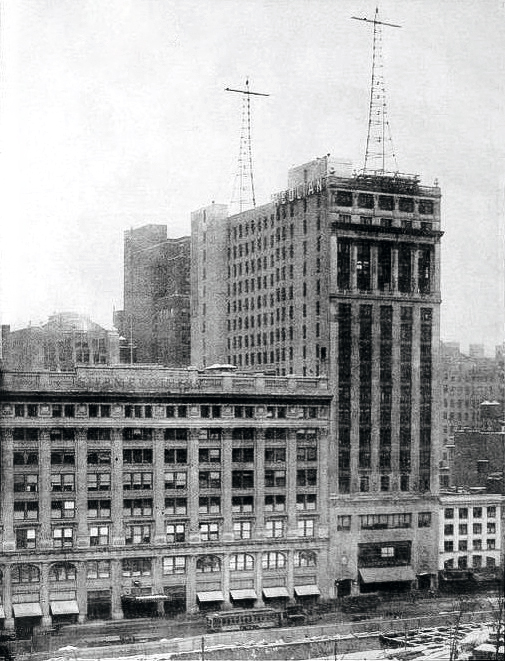
The Aeolian Hall in New York City was home to WJY–WJZ and the "WJZ chain" of the "radio group".

The "radio group" quickly recognized the value of network programming, but was badly handicapped in its attempts to effectively compete. AT&T's assertion that only it could sell radio advertising meant that the radio group stations had to be commercial-free, and thus were financed by their owners, which soon became a major drain on company profits. The radio group efforts centered on WJZ, a Newark, New Jersey, station RCA acquired from Westinghouse and moved to New York City on May 14, 1923, the same day WJY launched as a time-share, also owned by RCA and broadcasting from WJZ's Aeolian Hall facilities. RCA then inaugurated WRC in Washington, D.C., as a time-share with WCAP on August 1, 1923; much of RCA's early efforts involved linking WRC and WJZ just as WCAP was already doing for WEAF. However, AT&T generally refused access to its high-quality telephone lines to competitors, so these efforts generally tried to use telegraph lines, which were found to be incapable of good quality audio transmissions. Use of high-powered stations and shortwave connections were also investigated, but none of these approaches matched the reliability and quality of AT&T's telephone links.

The first RCA network broadcast occurred on November 17, 1923, when WJZ rebroadcast play-by-play of a Princeton Tigers–Harvard Crimson college football game over GE's WGY in Schenectady, New York, linked together via the Western Union system. The first attempt at using shortwave for chain broadcasting took place on March 7, 1924, when Westinghouse's KFKX in Hastings, Nebraska—constructed as an experimental repeater for KDKA and supplanting KDPM in Cleveland, Ohio—was part of a four-station network involving WJZ, WGY and KDKA, with KGO in San Francisco receiving KFKX's signal. While that experimental relay suffered from "barely distinguishable" audio on KGO's end, a second attempt (also including WRC) on November 15, 1924, was judged a transcontinental success as KGO was better able to pick up KFKX. The "WJZ chain" saw little growth compared to AT&T's efforts. President Coolidge's March 1925 inaugural speech was sent over an AT&T transcontinental network of 23 stations, but the WJZ chain's broadcast of the speech was carried by only four stations, all located in the East.

=== Formation of the National Broadcasting Company ===
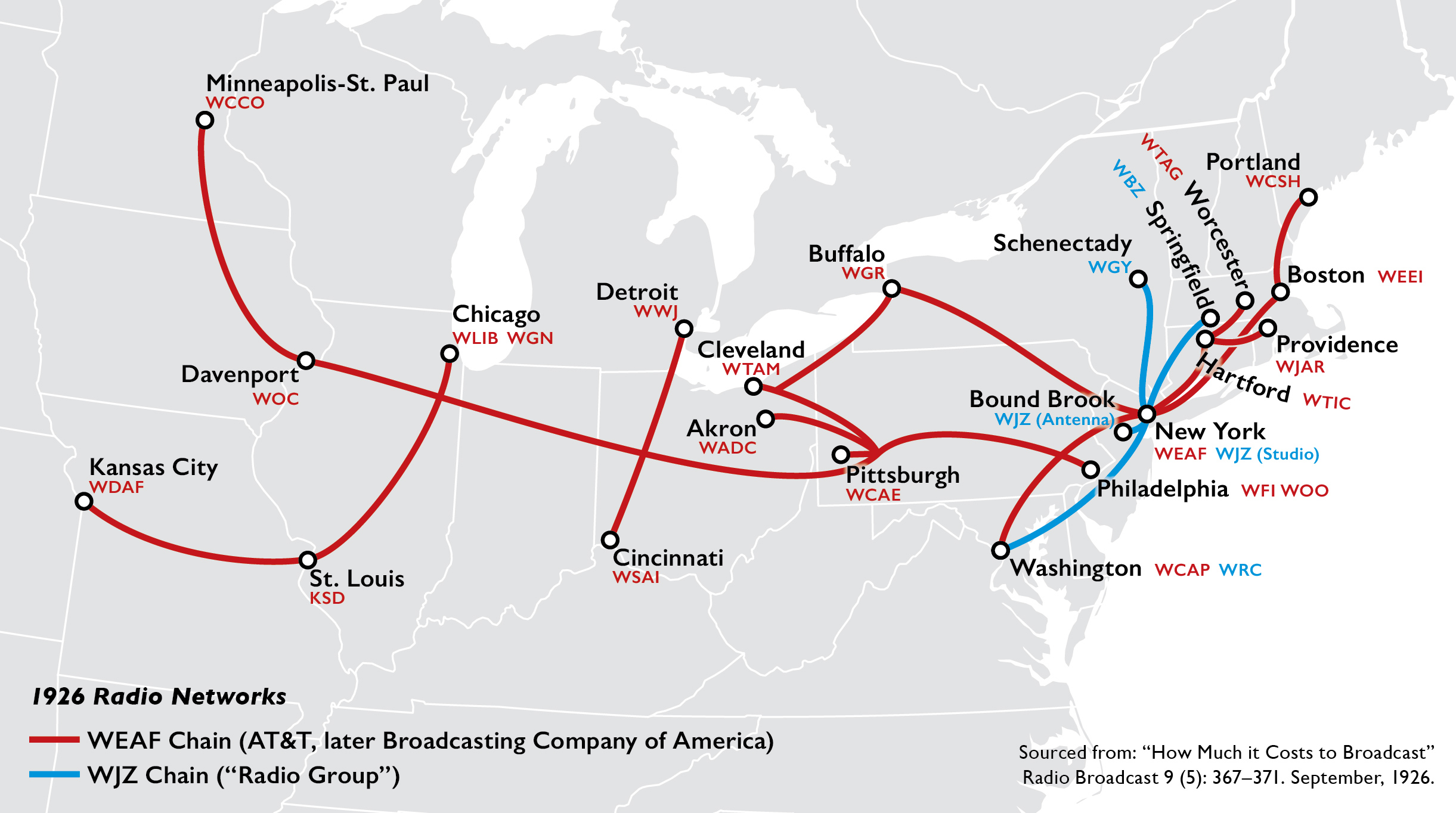
The WEAF (red) and WJZ (blue) chains in 1926

In 1926, AT&T consolidated its radio broadcasting operations into the newly formed Broadcasting Company of America (BCA) subsidiary, and a few weeks later agreed to sell BCA's assets to RCA for approximately $1 million (equivalent to $18.2 million in 2025), a deal made public on July 22, 1926. This sale transferred ownership of WEAF to RCA; included was WEAF's network of 15 stations, plus an agreement by AT&T to make its telephone lines readily available for networking. In a separate deal, WCAP was sold to RCA on July 28, 1926, its broadcast hours ceded to time-share partner WRC three days later. Variety regarded the sale as an economical one for AT&T, as the WEAF chain generated an annual income of $500,000, with little hope of turning a profit, "which even an affluent corporation like (AT&T) takes into consideration". While the deal was criticized for granting RCA a monopoly on broadcasting, a charge RCA denied, then-Secretary of Commerce Herbert Hoover declined to publicly comment; Chief Radio Supervisor W. D. Terrell stated that neither he or anyone else in the Commerce Department had legal jurisdiction to reject the deal inasmuch as they could not prevent a store from selling bread or meat.

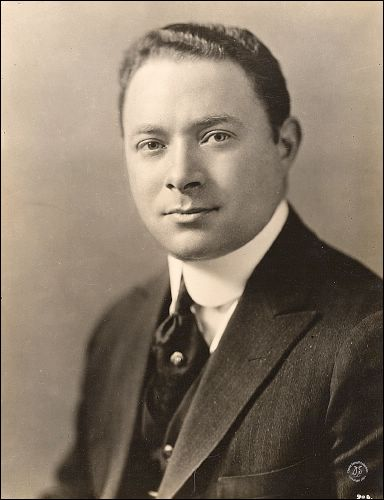
David Sarnoff

On September 13, 1926, RCA chairman of the board Owen D. Young and president James G. Harbord announced the formation of the National Broadcasting Company, Inc., to begin operations upon RCA's acquisition of WEAF on November 15. A widely placed full-page company advertisement stated that: "The purpose of the National Broadcasting Company will be to provide the best program available for broadcasting in the United States. ... It is hoped that arrangements may be made so that every event of national importance may be broadcast widely throughout the United States." As part of a renegotiation of the cross-licensing agreements, NBC was also permitted to accept advertising. The purchase of WEAF and NBC's formation was seen as an achievement for RCA's general manager David Sarnoff, who was later regarded as the founder of NBC.

NBC's network operations were officially launched with a gala broadcast beginning at 8 p.m. Eastern Time on November 15, 1926. In anticipation, one newspaper reported: "The most pretentious broadcasting program ever presented, featuring among other stars of the theatrical, concert and radio field, some of whom have never been heard on the air, will mark the introduction of the National Broadcasting company to the radio public Monday evening", with NBC president Merlin H. Aylesworth characterizing the event as "a four-hour program beginning at 8 p.m., which will live long in their memories as an occasion marking another milestone in the history of radio broadcasting". Carl Schlegel of the Metropolitan Opera opened the inaugural broadcast, which also featured Will Rogers and Mary Garden. This broadcast, which included a remote link from KYW in Chicago, was coordinated through WEAF, and carried by twenty-two eastern and Midwestern stations, located as far west as WDAF in Kansas City, Missouri.

== Networks ==
=== Red and Blue networks ===
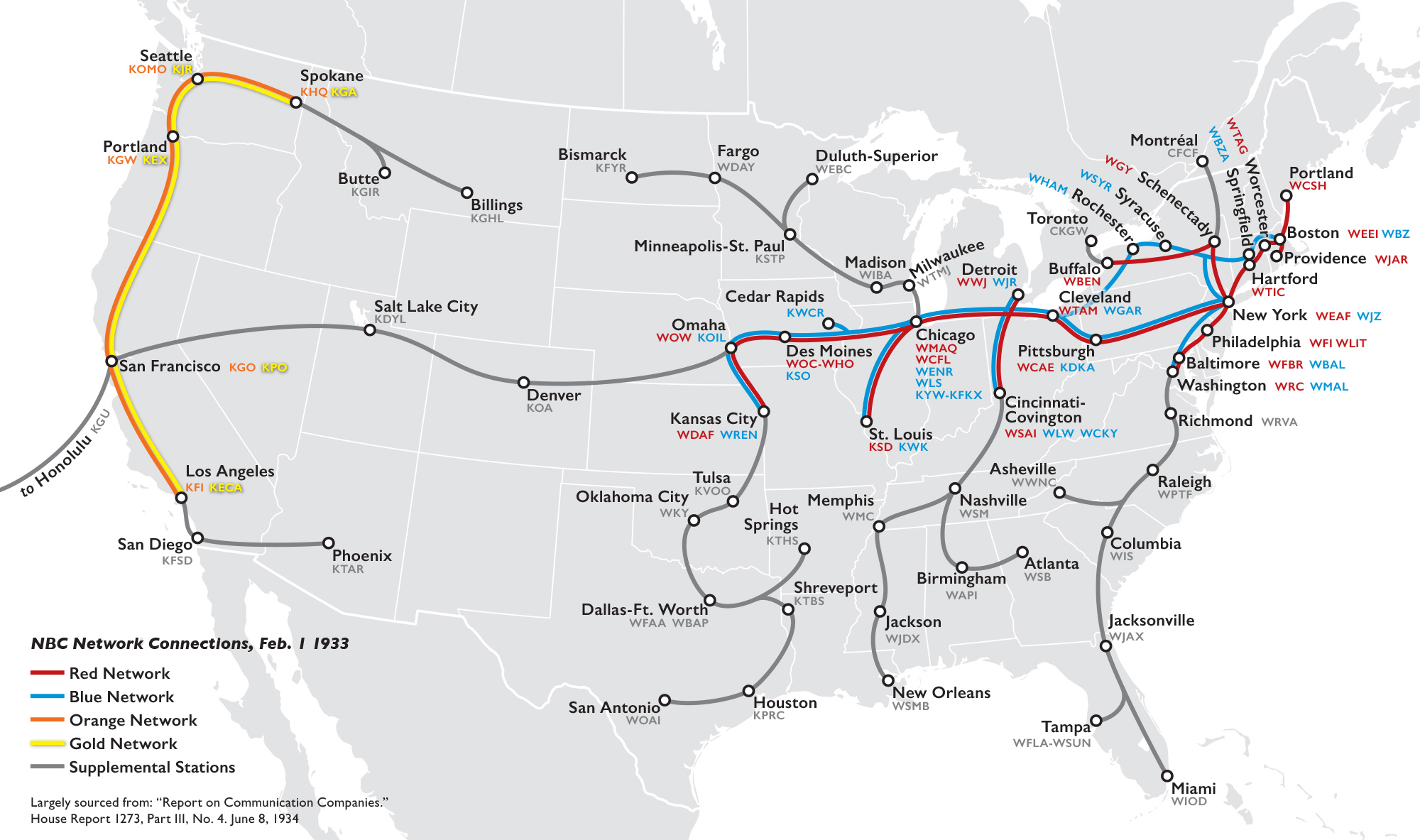
NBC networks, 1933

Following NBC's formation, RCA inaugurated a second network on January 1, 1927; called "the 'blue' network", it was led by WJZ along with Westinghouse's WBZ, KDKA and KYW; with the WEAF-led chain concurrently named "the 'red' network". The debut program, sponsored by the Victor Talking Machine Company, (Note: Coincidentally, Victor Talking Machine Company was purchased by RCA outright in 1929.) was carried on both chains and subsequently alternated between "red" and "blue" on a weekly basis.

WEAF historian William Peck Banning suggested the "red" and "blue" names originated from circuit maps drafted in colored pencil by Bell System engineers, which carried over as these circuits began to be used exclusively for radio, thus the former "WEAF chain"—mapped out in red—became "the 'red' network". RCA's Radio Age magazine outlined a similar reason in 1942, four years before Banning's book was published. Other possible explanations for the names included push-pins engineers used to mark affiliates of WEAF (red pins) and WJZ (blue pins), the colors of wires used for switchboards, or from jack panel connections. The names were not commonplace as newspapers also referred to "NBC-WEAF" or "NBC-WJZ"; NBC made "NBC Red" and "NBC Blue" official network designations by 1936.

=== Orange Network ===
As 1927 began, KFI in Los Angeles and KPO in San Francisco were successfully transmitting live programming to a regional network of their own, dubbed the "Orange Network", notably originating play-by-play of the 1927 Rose Bowl and a live performance of Carmen from the Philharmonic Auditorium on January 23, 1927; the latter broadcast was additionally relayed over CNVR in Vancouver, WAMD in Minneapolis, and WGY. Affiliating the chain with NBC, the Orange Network relayed an address by President Coolidge that jointly aired over the Red and Blue networks on February 22. The Orange Network formally relaunched as a part of NBC on April 5, 1927, adding KGO and three other stations. NBC eventually utilized the Orange Network to relay Red Network programming to the Pacific states, with the Red Network relaying Orange Network programming for the Eastern Seaboard.

=== Adding stations and "Radio City" ===
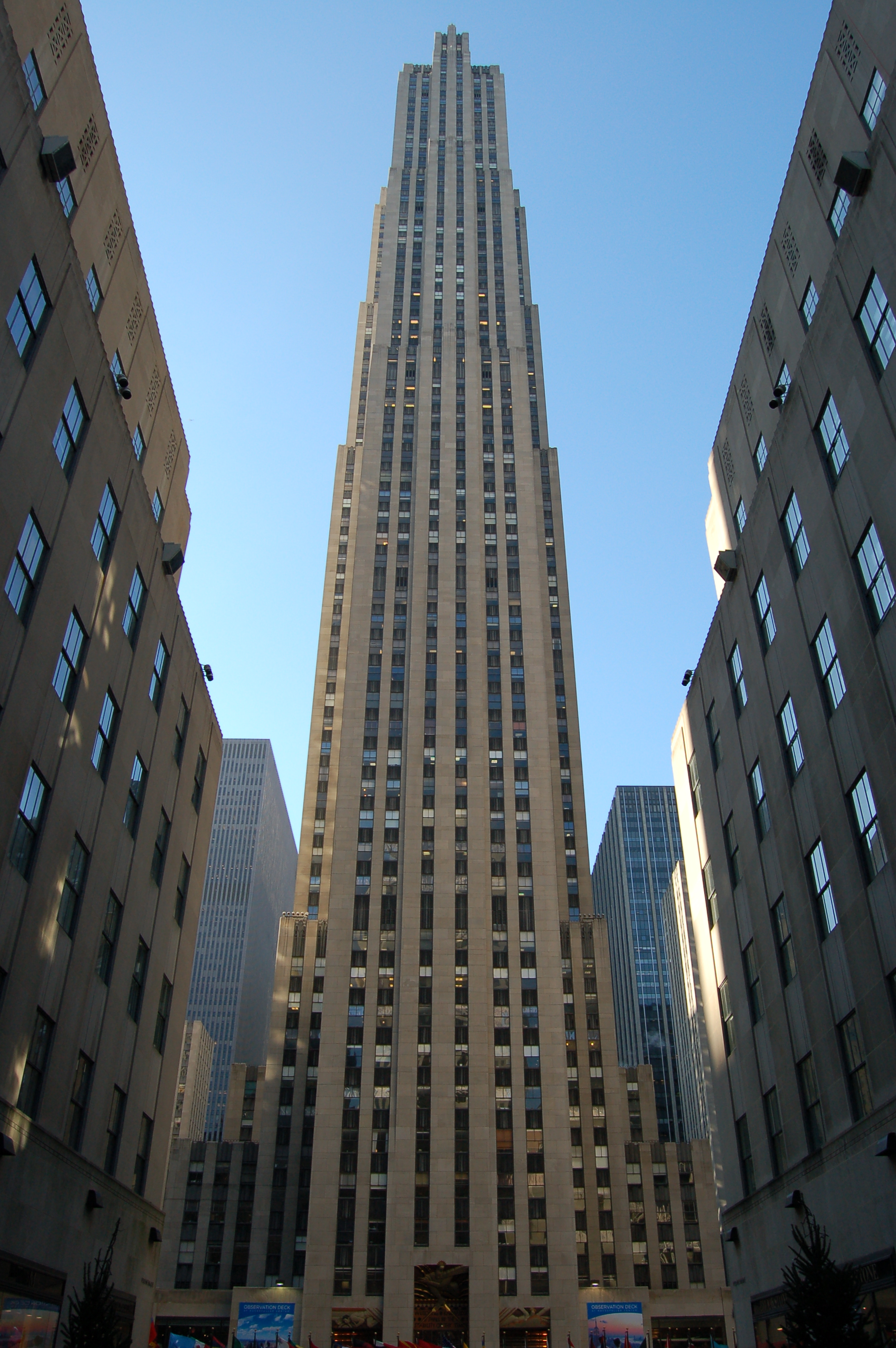
30 Rockefeller Plaza, NBC's headquarters since 1933

At the same time, NBC began acquiring radio stations to extend its reach, beginning with KGO and KOA in Denver, Colorado, from GE in March 1930. Cleveland affiliate WTAM, a 50,000 watt clear-channel station, was purchased from Cleveland Electric Illuminating and the Van Sweringen brothers on October 16, 1930. Chicago station WENR, time-sharing with WLS, was purchased in July 1931 from Samuel Insull for $1 million (equivalent to $21.2 million in 2025), a purchase price compared to the then-record set with WEAF in 1926. WENR was paired with Columbia Broadcasting System (CBS) affiliate WMAQ when NBC acquired it from the Chicago Daily News on November 1, 1931; like WTAM, WMAQ and WENR-WLS were also clear-channels. KPO was then purchased from Hale Bros. on June 10, 1932, officially pairing it with KGO. The previous October, KPO became one of the lead stations for the NBC Gold Network, a regional chain of stations that also relayed Blue Network programming. WRC was paired with WMAL in 1933 when NBC took over operations of that station from founding owner M. A. Leese via a lease agreement.

NBC's operations, including WEAF and WJZ, moved to 711 Fifth Avenue in 1927, designed by architect Lloyd Brown. The studios featured elements of Gothic architecture, the Roman Forum and Louis XIV in stark contrast to radio studios of that era; Raymond Hood designed the studios under the belief a well-designed studio could act as an audience for the performers. Due to NBC's rapid growth, the network outgrew these facilities. RCA agreed to a lease in May 1930 as the lead tenant for 30 Rockefeller Plaza which was still under construction, including a studio complex for NBC and theaters for RCA-owned RKO Radio Pictures. Named the RCA Building in May 1932, the deal was arranged through the Rockefeller Center's founder and financier, John D. Rockefeller Jr., along with GE chairman Owen D. Young, David Sarnoff and Raymond Hood. RCA had been spun off as its own fully-independent company in 1932 through a consent decree with the U.S. Department of Justice resolving antitrust charges; Westinghouse and GE gave up their ownership stakes in the company, while restrictions created through RCA's cross-licensing agreements for nearly 4,000 patents were also removed. A ceremonial broadcast over both NBC networks on November 11, 1933, formally opened the RCA Building's "Radio City" studios, with Sarnoff, Young, NBC president Merlin H. Aylesworth and BBC Director-General John Reith participating in a live transatlantic conversation. "Radio City" occupied ten floors of the RCA Building with thirty-five studios supported by 1,250 miles (2,010 km) of wiring and 89 miles (143 km) of cables.

=== Notable programs ===
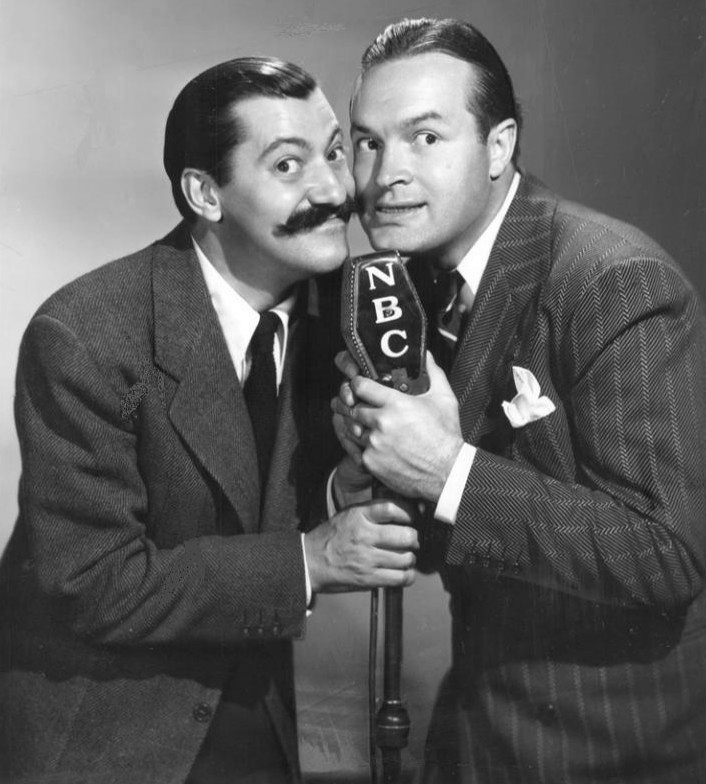
Bob Hope with sidekick Jerry Colonna (left). Save for a brief run on CBS in 1935, Hope's radio shows aired on NBC Blue and Red from 1937 through 1950 in what became a 60-year career with NBC.

During much of radio's "Golden Age", both NBC networks—in particular NBC Red—were home to multiple popular performers and programs. The two networks originally did not have distinct identities or "formats" and, beginning in 1929, shared use of the distinctive three-note "NBC chimes". The WEAF-led Red Network, with a robust affiliate lineup, was seen as carrying more popular, "big budget" sponsored programs in comparison to the WJZ-led Blue Network, which had a smaller lineup of often lower-powered stations. Both networks shared sales executives, off- and on-air staff, and production and studio facilities; it was not until c. 1938 that a concerted effort began to distinguish NBC Red and NBC Blue. One 1939 story in Time magazine described NBC Blue as "... long considered a weak sister to NBC's Red Network".

Most network programs were owned by their sponsors and produced by advertising agencies. For example, Lum and Abner was sponsored by Quaker Oats in 1931 when WMAQ originated the show regionally, became a sustaining program when it debuted over NBC Red in 1932, then sponsored by Ford the following year (originating from WTAM). Moving to the Mutual Broadcasting System in 1934 and to NBC Blue in 1935, Horlicks became the sponsor. NBC Blue sometimes carried newer and untried programs that, if successful, moved "up" to the Red Network at the behest of the sponsor, these shows included Amos 'n' Andy, Fibber McGee and Molly, Information, Please!, The Bob Hope Show and The Jack Benny Program.

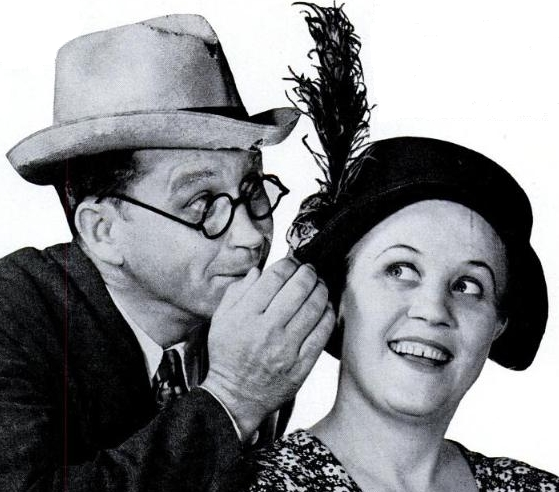
Jim and Marian Jordan as comedy duo "Fibber McGee and Molly". Debuting on NBC Blue in 1935, their show moved to NBC Red in 1938, where it lasted until 1955.

This practice of moving popular shows over to NBC Red, coupled with NBC Blue's reputation as a weaker network, likely originated the misperception that NBC Blue solely featured sustaining programs (e.g., news, cultural and educational programs which had no sponsor) and NBC Red solely featured commercial fare. As it was, networks had limited control over their schedules as advertisers bought available time periods for programs, regardless of what other sponsors broadcast in other time slots. Networks rented out studio facilities used to produce shows and sold air-time to sponsors. Sustaining programs were the only programs produced by the networks and were used to fill unsold time periods (affiliated stations had the option to "break away" from the network to air a local program during these periods) but the network had the "option" to take back the time period if a network sponsor wanted the time period. Dramatic programs, which comprised only 2 percent of program time on NBC Red in 1926, accounted for 25 percent of the network's airtime by 1942.

The network provided a rich variety of classical concert broadcasts, including performances by the Metropolitan Opera (1931–1940) and the NBC Symphony Orchestra (1937–1954) conducted by Arturo Toscanini. Notable series include the General Motors Concerts (1929–1937) and The Eastman School of Music Symphony (1932–1942). From 1935 to 1950, it presented numerous live remote broadcasts of popular music from ballrooms, hotels, supper clubs and Army camps. Among the band leaders with regular time slots on NBC were Carmen Cavallaro, Nat King Cole, Xavier Cugat, Tommy Dorsey, Eddy Duchin, Benny Goodman, Stan Kenton, Guy Lombardo, Glenn Miller, Leo Reisman, and Paul Whiteman. NBC's radio news service featured regular broadcasts by journalists and commentators, including Morgan Beatty, Alex Dreier, Pauline Frederick, Floyd Gibbons, John Gunther, Richard Harkness, George Hicks, H. V. Kaltenborn, John MacVane, Adela Rogers St. Johns, Dorothy Thompson, Edward Tomlinson, and Hendrik Willem van Loon.

=== Affiliates ===
NBC Red/Blue's secondary 1930s' logo, commonly seen on microphone flags

From the network's formation, NBC was a dominant force on the radio landscape. In 1932, out of the 40 clear-channel stations licensed by the Federal Radio Commission (FRC), 28 were affiliated with either NBC network, 13 were affiliated with CBS, and two were independents. By 1939, the Red and Blue networks were competing with CBS and the Mutual Broadcasting System in providing nationwide coverage. NBC advertising rate cards of the period listed "basic" and "supplemental" affiliated stations. Advertisers were encouraged to buy time for their programs on the full "basic" line-up (plus any "supplemental" stations they wished) but this was open to negotiation. It was not unusual for Red Network advertisers to place shows on Blue Network stations in certain markets (and the other way around). Supplemental stations were generally located in smaller cities away from the network trunk lines. Such stations were usually offered to advertisers on both the Red and Blue Network line-ups.

As of early 1939, the Red Network was divided into five geographical regions. The East consisted of 16 basic and 16 supplemental stations; the Midwest had 8 basic and 15 supplemental stations; the South had 7 basic and 30 supplemental stations; Mountain had 2 basic and 9 supplemental stations, and Pacific had 5 basic and 7 supplemental stations. For example, in Louisville, Kentucky, a larger market, the basic station was WAVE, the supplemental was WGRC—also a primary Mutual affiliate.

=== Separation of NBC Red and NBC Blue ===
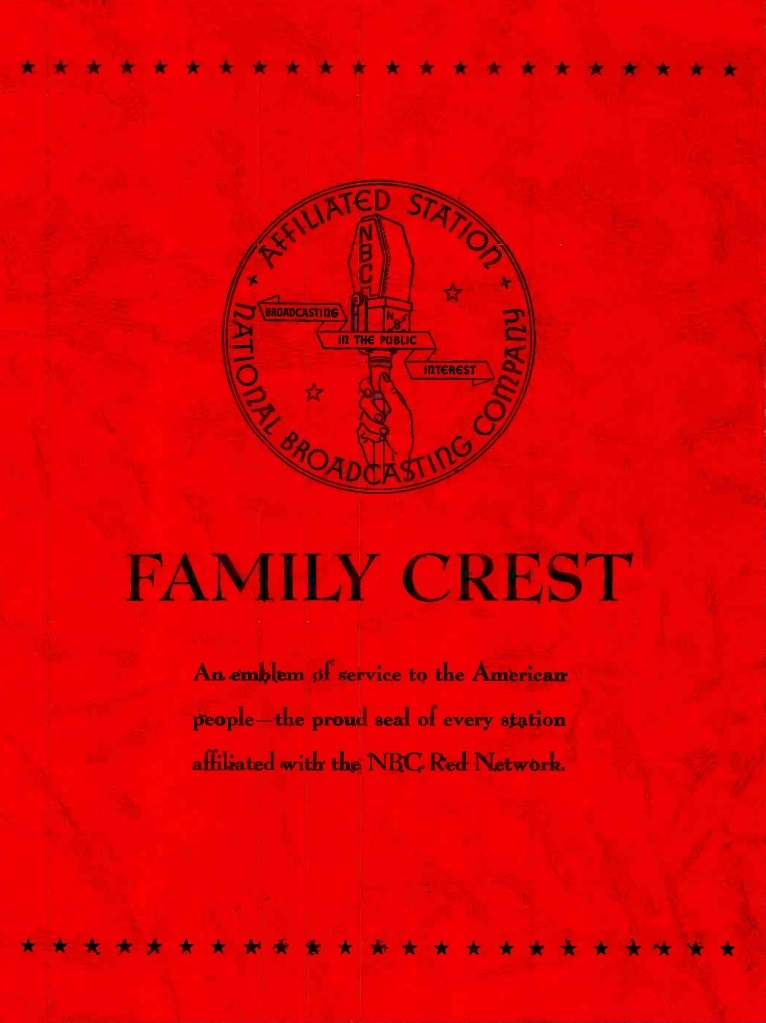
1942 advertisement for the NBC Red network.

Concerned that NBC's control of two national radio networks gave it too much power over the industry, in May 1941 the Federal Communications Commission (FCC) promulgated a rule, the Report on Chain Broadcasting, designed to force NBC to divest one of them. RCA fought the divestiture order, but divided NBC into two companies in case an appeal was lost. The Blue network became the "NBC Blue Network, Inc." and the NBC Red became "NBC Red Network, Inc." Effective January 10, 1942, the two networks had their operations formally divorced, and the Blue Network was referred to on the air as either "Blue" or "Blue Network," with its official corporate name being Blue Network Company, Inc. Consequently, the NBC Red Network became known on-air as simply "NBC" on September 1, 1942.

The FCC order was ultimately upheld by the U.S Supreme Court in National Broadcasting Co. v. United States, asserting that the FCC had authority to regulate the networks and their associations with affiliates. Consequently, the Blue Network was sold on July 30, 1943, to candy magnate Edward J. Noble for $8 million. When the deal closed on October 12, the Blue Network came under ownership of "American Broadcasting System, Inc." The Blue Network was formally renamed as the American Broadcasting Company on June 15, 1945.

== After the "Golden Age of Radio" ==
=== Development of FM and television ===
NBC and RCA were one of the key forces in the development of television in the 1930s and 1940s, dating back to New York City experimental station W2XBS in 1928. Before the American entry into World War II in 1941, W2XBS was officially licensed as WNBT (channel 1). NBC also launched W2XWG, an experimental Apex station, in April 1939; after planned FM station W51NY failed due to World War II shortages preventing the station's 10,000 watt transmitter from being built, NBC converted W2XWG to commercial operation in 1944 as WEAF-FM. In order to further align the network's radio flagship with the network, on November 1, 1946, WEAF and WEAF-FM changed call signs to WNBC and WNBC-FM, respectively. West Coast flagship KPO followed suit, becoming KNBC on November 23, 1947.

Following the lead of WNBT, NBC filed applications for multiple FM and television stations as adjuncts to their radio properties as early as 1943, including for TV outlets in Denver and San Francisco. The network ultimately built and signed on the following TV stations: WNBW in Washington, D.C. (June 27, 1947), WNBK in Cleveland (October 30, 1948), WNBQ in Chicago (January 9, 1949) and KNBH in Los Angeles (January 16, 1949); all five TV stations contained the letter combination "NB" within their call signs. FM stations built and signed on by NBC included: KOA-FM, WRC-FM (June 1947), WMAQ-FM (October 13, 1948), WTAM-FM (December 6, 1948) and KNBR-FM (October 12, 1949). In hopes of buying a Los Angeles radio outlet to complement KNBH, NBC sold KOA and KOA-FM in 1952 to a group that included Bob Hope. While initially only carrying NBC programming, WNBT started adding a slate of local shows and soon featured five hours of local programs during the daytime by May 1950.

=== The CBS "Paley raids" and television's emergence ===
A business built on a few comedians isn't a business worth being in.

— David Sarnoff, in response to CBS's 1948 "Paley raids" on NBC talent

For two decades the NBC radio network's roster of stars provided ratings consistently surpassing those of CBS, its main competitor. But in 1948, as the transition from radio to television was beginning, NBC's leadership came under attack due to what became known as the "Paley raids", named after the president of CBS, William S. Paley. After World War II the tax rate for annual incomes above $70,000 was 77 percent, while capital gains were taxed at 25 percent. Paley worked out an accounting technique whereby individual performers could set up corporations that allowed their earnings to be taxed at the significantly lower rate. Instead of NBC responding with a similar package, RCA's president, David Sarnoff, decided that this accounting method was legally and ethically wrong. NBC's performers did not agree, and most of the top stars, including Amos 'n' Andy, Jack Benny, Red Skelton, Edgar Bergen, Burns and Allen, Ed Wynn, Fred Waring, Al Jolson, Groucho Marx and Frank Sinatra moved from NBC to CBS. One notable exception was Bob Hope, who not only stayed, but moved to NBC television; by the time of his retirement in 1996, Hope's association with NBC spanned nearly 60 years.

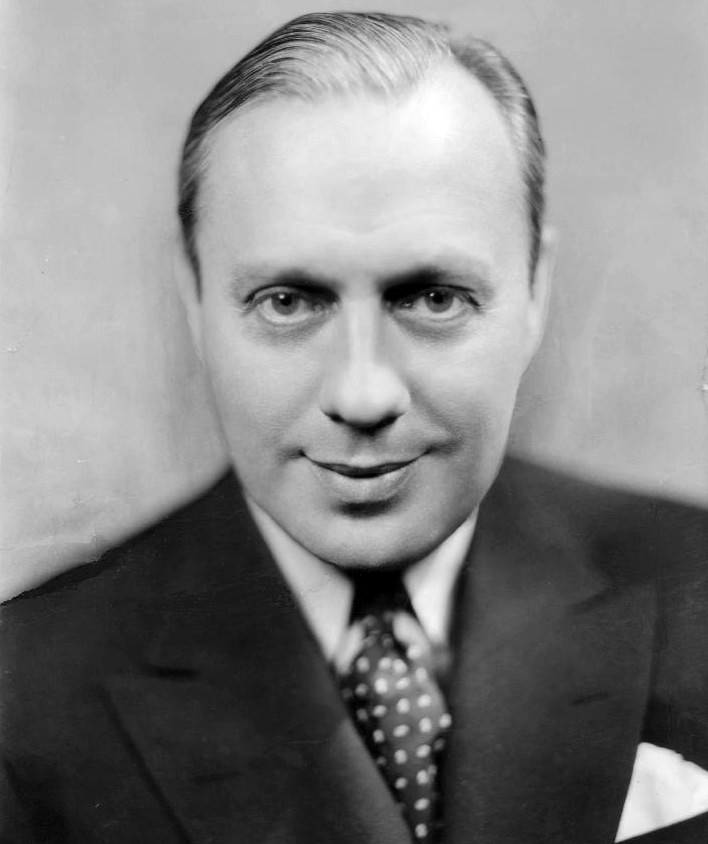
Jack Benny

As a result of the defections, CBS boasted in 1949 of having sixteen of the twenty top rated programs. The consequences carried over to television, where CBS maintained its newfound dominance for decades. Paley personally worked to woo the performers, while Sarnoff professed his indifference to the defections, stating at an annual meeting that "Leadership built over the years on a foundation of solid service cannot be snatched overnight by buying a few high-priced comedians. Leadership is not a laughing matter." In part due to the talent raids, NBC president Niles Trammell—who had been with NBC since 1929 and RCA since 1933—resigned to help establish WCKT in Miami with the Cox and Knight newspaper families. WCKT signed on with an NBC-TV affiliation, ostensibly as a reward for Trammell's loyalty. The "Paley raids" had other consequences for RCA itself: Sarnoff and Paley (who also headed up Columbia Records) originally agreed to a new phonograph record standard of 33 RPM to replace the long-standing 78 RPM standard. After Jack Benny defected to CBS, Sarnoff rescinded the agreement and began marketing the RCA-developed 45 RPM instead; pressured by record stores and other major labels, RCA eventually agreed to the 33 RPM standard, but the feud risked creating damage to the record industry as a whole.

Many NBC radio stars gravitated to television as it became more popular. Toscanini made ten appearances on NBC-TV simulcast on the radio network between 1948 and 1952. Texaco Star Theater, an umbrella title for various radio variety shows from 1938 to 1949, migrated to NBC-TV in 1948 with Milton Berle as host, becoming both a cultural landmark and the first successful hit program in the medium. In the first of what became several efforts to keep classic radio relevant, NBC sanctioned The Big Show, a 90-minute Sunday night variety program which debuted on November 5, 1950. Hosted by stage actress Tallulah Bankhead, it harked back to radio's earliest musical variety style along with sophisticated comedy and drama. The Big Show was also a challenge to CBS's Sunday night lineup, much of which had come from NBC, including—and especially—Jack Benny. Despite critical praise, The Big Show's initial success failed to last as NBC cancelled it after only two years, purportedly losing a million dollars on the project.

To reflect RCA's ownership, some of NBC's radio and television stations adopted "RCA"-derived call signs in October 1954: WNBC/WNBT in New York became WRCA-AM-FM-TV, WNBW in Washington became WRC-TV, and KNBH in Los Angeles became KRCA. By 1960, the New York radio stations reverted to WNBC-AM-FM and WRCA-TV became WNBC-TV. In 1962, KRCA became KNBC, while KNBC-AM-FM in San Francisco became KNBR-AM-FM. WNBQ in Chicago became WMAQ-TV in 1964. NBC also purchased WKNB in New Britain, Connecticut, in late 1956, and WJAS and WJAS-FM in Pittsburgh, in 1957. The acquisition of WJAS was to offset KDKA's defection from the network several years earlier, while WKNB was included as part of the sale of its sister television station. NBC had no interest in owning a daytime-only station in the shadow of its powerful Hartford, Connecticut, affiliate, WTIC, so the network sold WKNB in 1960. The Pittsburgh stations were sold in 1972.

=== 1956 trade with Westinghouse ===
In 1956, NBC sought to get an owned-and-operated television station in the Philadelphia market, so it forced a station ownership/call sign swap with Westinghouse Broadcasting. NBC acquired Westinghouse's KYW radio and WPTZ television in Philadelphia (which became WRCV-AM-TV, for the "RCA Victor" record label) while Westinghouse received NBC's WTAM-AM-FM and WNBK television in Cleveland (all of which took the KYW call signs). Westinghouse also received $3 million in cash compensation.

After Westinghouse expressed its unhappiness with the arrangement, the United States Department of Justice took NBC to court in late 1956. In a civil antitrust lawsuit filed against NBC and RCA, Westinghouse claimed the network threatened to pull their TV affiliation from Westinghouse's Philadelphia and Boston stations, and withhold an affiliation from their Pittsburgh TV property if Westinghouse did not agree to the trade. In August 1964 NBC's license for WRCV radio and television was renewed by the FCC—but only on the condition that the 1956 station swap be reversed. Following nearly a year of appeals by NBC, the Supreme Court declared the trade null and void in June 1965; the KYW call letters were moved back to Philadelphia with Westinghouse while NBC rechristened the Cleveland stations as WKYC-AM-FM-TV, a derivative of KYW. NBC kept ownership of the Cleveland radio stations until 1972, selling them off to Ohio Communications.

=== Major League Baseball (1957–1975) ===
In 1957, NBC Radio won the rights to broadcast the Major League Baseball All-Star Game and World Series from Mutual, who had held exclusive rights since 1942 and 1939, respectively, for both events. It gave NBC sole control of the big events in baseball as they had been exclusively airing both the All Star Game and World Series on television since 1947. NBC ended its radio association with baseball after the 1975 season in order to clear space for its 24-hour "News And Information" service programming, though it continued broadcasting on its television network until 1989 (while splitting coverage with ABC in all but the first year of that period).

=== Monitor ===
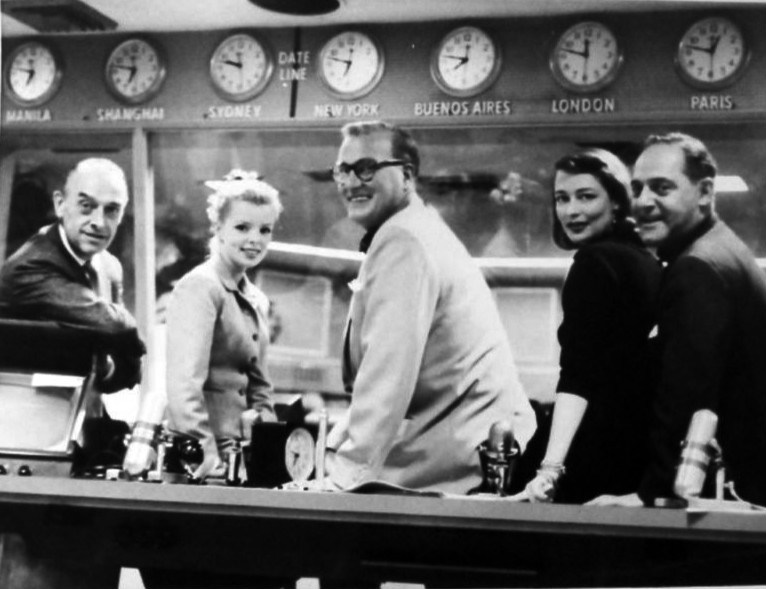
Monitor Sunday hosts in Radio Central, c. 1957. Left-right: Frank Gallop, "Monitor Medley Girl" Lorna Lynn, Dave Garroway, "Miss Monitor" Tedi Thurman and Ben Grauer.

NBC Radio drastically revamped its programming lineup with Monitor, a continuous, all-weekend programming umbrella featuring a mix of music, news, interviews and features that debuted on June 12, 1955. Monitor boasted a variety of hosts including such well-known television personalities as Dave Garroway, Hugh Downs, Ed McMahon, Joe Garagiola and Gene Rayburn. The potpourri also tried to keep vintage radio alive in featuring segments from Jim and Marian Jordan (in character as Fibber McGee and Molly), Ethel and Albert and iconoclastic satirist Henry Morgan.

Monitor is credited for succeeding in an era where television became the dominant entertainment medium, but after the mid-1960s, local stations with established music formats—especially in larger markets—became increasingly reluctant to run network fare, dropping the program block outright, including flagship WNBC. In turn, the number of sponsors for Monitor began to decline precipitously. Monitor's final broadcast took place over the weekend of January 25–26, 1975. From that point onward, the NBC Radio Network's main lineup consisted of hourly newscasts and commentary segments, plus religious programs and Meet the Press on Sundays.

=== Other programming ventures ===
NBC "News and Information Service" logo

Monitor was succeeded by another major programming investment: the NBC News and Information Service (NIS). Conceived by NBC Radio president Jack G. Thayer as a secondary network for local stations wishing to adopt an all-news radio format, NIS supplied up to 55 minutes of news content per hour to stations. Thayer described NIS as "an over-all restyling" of NBC Radio providing "a more contemporary feel". While the main NBC Radio Network had been losing money in recent years, Thayer stressed NIS was not to replace it, nor was the main network threatened with closure. NBC assigned NIS to all but one of their FM stations—WNWS in New York (the former WNBC-FM), WNIS in Chicago (the former WJOI) and KNAI in San Francisco (the former KNBR-FM); WRC in Washington also became an affiliate, while WKYS (the former WRC-FM) assumed WRC's existing Top 40 format. Other major affiliates included WBAL-FM in Baltimore, KHVH in Honolulu, KQV in Pittsburgh and KRUX in Glendale–Phoenix.

At the end of 1975, NIS had 57 affiliates, significantly less than the 227 stations which carried either part or all of Monitor when it ceased; additionally, the NBC-owned NIS affiliates all failed to make a profit in 1975, but the network hoped for them to break even in the coming year. As 1976 progressed, however, only 62 affiliates remained with NIS after 18 months, some of which were competing against long-established news-focused stations. Assuming over $10 million (equivalent to $56.6 million in 2025) in losses, Thayer announced the closure of NIS in November 1976 in six months, allowing for affiliates to find alternate programming. While some former NIS affiliates—including WRC and KQV—remained with all-news formats, the NBC-owned FM stations all adopted music formats.

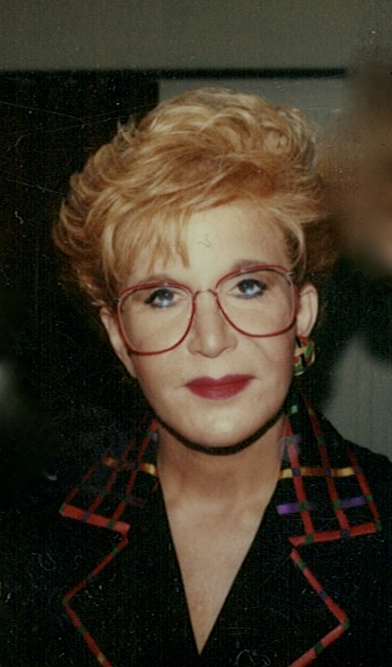
Sally Jesse Raphael

In 1979, NBC launched The Source, a secondary network that targeted younger listeners, providing news, short features and music specials to FM rock stations. The Source also featured a talk show hosted by sex columnist Ruth Westheimer beginning in 1984, which originated at NBC's New York FM station WYNY. NBC Radio's last major programming venture occurred with the November 2, 1981, debut of NBC Talknet, a talk radio program block for the late-evening hours. Headlined by advice host Sally Jessy Raphael and personal finance talker Bruce Williams, NBC Talknet was largely inspired by the success of the all-night Larry King Show on Mutual. When Williams was critically injured in a 1982 airplane crash, he resumed his NBC Talknet show four weeks later, conducting it from his hospital room. Williams' show proved to be very successful and ultimately outlived NBC Talknet itself.

NBC Radio Entertainment was established in December 1984 to handle the distribution of Jazz with David Sanborn and Live From the Hard Rock Cafe with Paul Shaffer, along with an oldies show hosted by WNBC's Soupy Sales. NBC Radio also acquired the national play-by-play rights for NFL games for both the 1985 and 1986 seasons, outbidding long-standing rights holder CBS Radio.

== Divestiture ==
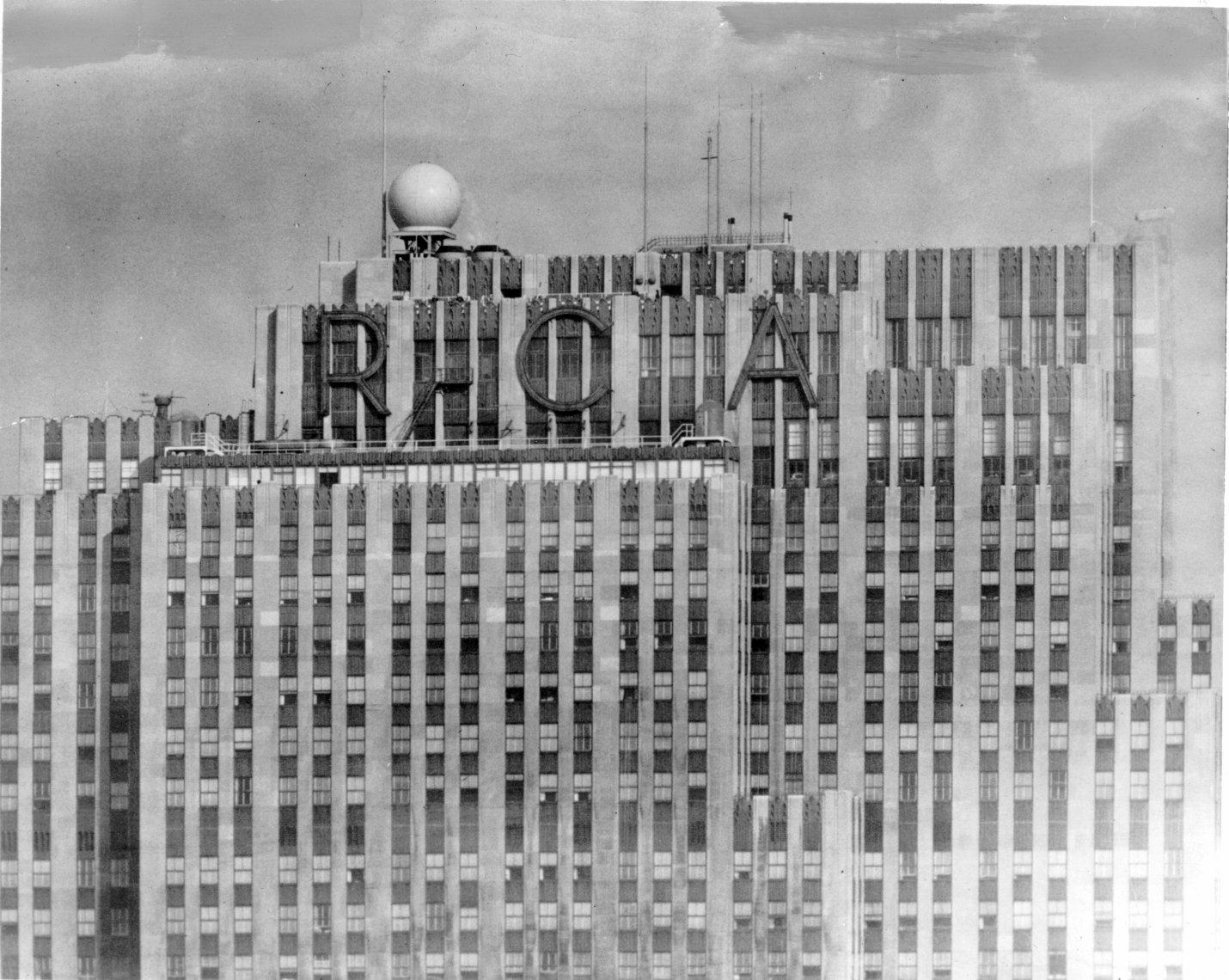
Former "RCA" signage at the top of 30 Rockefeller Plaza

NBC made its final radio station acquisition in 1983 when it bought Boston station WJIB from GE, which was divesting its radio properties. In February 1984, the network sold WRC in Washington to Greater Media for $3.6 million (equivalent to $11.2 million in 2025).

On December 11, 1985, GE announced it was acquiring RCA in a $6.28 billion deal (equivalent to $18.8 billion in 2025). Earlier in the year, RCA entertained merger talks with Universal Pictures parent MCA Inc. while fending off hostile takeover threats. GE requested in paperwork filed with the FCC that NBC's grandfathered status permitting radio-TV combinations in three markets be broken up within 18 months, (Note: FCC regulations at the time prevented cross-ownership of TV and radio stations by the same owner in a given market. While an existing radio-TV combination could be given "grandfathered" protection, this would be nullified upon a pending ownership change. When Capital Cities Communications, Inc. purchased ABC the previous year, it needed to file a request for a waiver to retain their radio-TV combinations.) retaining the five NBC-owned television stations and GE's KCNC-TV. A planned sale of the entire radio unit to Westinghouse Broadcasting at the end of 1986 collapsed, prompting Westwood One, a Culver City, California–based syndicator that acquired Mutual in 1985, to purchase the NBC Radio Network, The Source, NBC Talknet and NBC Radio Entertainment, along with leases to the radio network facilities at 1700 Broadway, for $50 million (equivalent to $142 million in 2025). As part of the deal, a long-term brand licensing deal for the "NBC Radio" name was agreed to, while NBC Radio employees, including in the news division, were transferred to Westwood One. The remaining divisions and assets of RCA, including RCA Records were spun off to various companies, including Bertelsmann and Thomson SA.

The seven NBC-owned radio stations, which initially agreed to remain with NBC Radio as affiliates, were all put up for sale and divested to various buyers between 1988 and 1989, including Emmis Communications, Westinghouse and Susquehanna Radio Corporation. WNBC was included in Emmis's multi-station purchase; as Emmis already owned WFAN in New York City, it sold that station's license and transferred the intellectual property onto the WNBC license, supplanting it outright (WNBC was thus regarded in media coverage as "ceasing operation"). The last station to be sold, KNBR, was delayed due to a long-term play-by-play contract with the San Francisco Giants that ran through the 1989 season.

== NBC Radio after 1987 ==
=== Dissolution into Westwood One ===
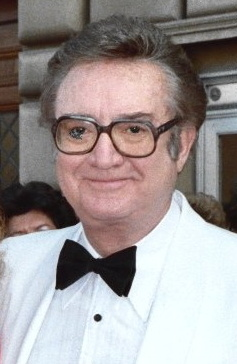
Steve Allen

Following the sale, NBC Radio added one long-form program to their lineup—a daily talk/variety show hosted by Steve Allen based from WNEW that debuted in October 1987. Westwood One initially promoted the show as part of the new "Mutual P.M." program service, but it was moved to being under the NBC umbrella prior to launch. Failing to get enough affiliates for the program, Allen ended the show the following March. The Sunday morning religious program The Eternal Light, for years the networks' only non-news program, ended its 45 year run on NBC Radio in 1989. Another NBC–branded program introduced following the Westwood One purchase was the morning newsmagazine First Light, hosted by Dirk Van, which debuted in April 1990. First Light was complimentary to Mutual's existing morning newsmagazine, America in The Morning hosted by Jim Bohannon.

Within a year of Westwood One's takeover, several tenured NBC Radio News staffers resigned, including London bureau chief Fred Kennedy, who told Broadcasting magazine, "what was once a great network and broadcast news operation is becoming an audio wire service... and not even a good audio wire service." Some affiliates also expressed concern over a decline in technical and editorial quality, even as NBC Radio successfully added 90 affiliates since the sale. Norm Pattiz, Westwood One founder/CEO, defended the consolidation moves by noting the radio networks had been losing up to $10 million, but emphasized "we are not dismantling the NBC networks". By January 1989, Westwood One announced NBC Radio News would move to Mutual's Arlington, Virginia, facility; engineering operations followed along with the affiliate relations department.

The Source, which had been reworked into both supplying short-form features and production elements for radio stations in 1988, moved their operations to Los Angeles by 1990. Mutual and NBC newscasts were further streamlined in 1992 with jointly-produced newscasts in overnights and weekends and both networks airing unbranded sportscasts through the weekend. NBC Talknet's operations also moved to the Arlington facilities in 1992 and largely continued until 1993, when it was limited solely to Bruce Williams' weeknight show—ceding the other three-hour slot to Jim Bohannon's Mutual talk show—and was eventually rebranded as a Westwood One program.

Infinity Broadcasting took over operations of Westwood One in 1994 after it sold to them competing syndicator Unistar Radio Networks; as part of the deal, Infinity purchased 25 percent of Westwood One, becoming its largest shareholder. Westinghouse Broadcasting's parent Westinghouse Electric Corporation—which bought out CBS and renamed itself CBS Corporation the following year—acquired Infinity for just shy of $5 billion in June 1996 (equivalent to $10.3 billion in 2025). An agreement was then reached for Westwood One to manage the CBS Radio Network, merging the descendants of the three original U.S. radio networks: NBC, CBS and Mutual. Another realignment in the fall of 1997 had the "NBC Radio Network" name revived, but as an internal brand name for Westwood One affiliates that had adult contemporary and country formats; The Source was also reworked into a brand name for affiliates with formats that targeted 18–34 males.

Westwood One had two superior news-gathering operations between CBS and CNN. Then we had a third one in Arlington. We were spending a lot of our effort in news-gathering and didn't need so many duplicate people cutting up the same Bill Clinton tape.

— Nick Kiernan, Westwood One vice president of affiliate relations, on the closing of the Mutual/NBC newsroom in Arlington, Virginia

On August 31, 1998, the combined Mutual/NBC newsroom in Arlington closed, with "Mutual" and "NBC" newscasts originating from CBS Radio News in New York. Westwood One then announced the full retirement of the Mutual name and ending of newscast production on April 17, 1999, with "NBC"–branded newscasts produced by CBS restricted to morning drive (ET) on weekdays. This curtailing was made as affiliates largely aired "NBC" newscasts in the morning hours. Remaining NBC affiliates were offered CNN Radio newscasts at all other times; CNN Radio was also offered as a replacement for former Mutual affiliates. The change notably forced WHIZ in Zanesville, Ohio, an NBC affiliate since 1939, to switch to ABC News.

With only a very small number of affiliates that remained, an end date for production of "NBC"–branded newscasts cannot be determined, but Westwood One continued to promote the "NBC Radio Network" on their corporate website as late as 2004. While his show had been rebranded under his name, Bruce Williams left Westwood One in June 2001, effectively ending the NBC Talknet service. In 1999, the last remaining program from the original NBC Radio Network, First Light, was changed to a Westwood One branded program and continued production until July 31, 2022.

=== NBC News Radio ===
The "NBC" name re-emerged on radio with NBC News Radio on March 31, 2003, featuring NBC and MSNBC anchors and reporters, but limited to one-minute newscasts on weekdays; Westwood One made the new service available to all radio stations the syndicator was affiliated with. Westwood One also began distributing an audio simulcast of Meet the Press to radio stations in 2004, a practice which continues to this day.

Westwood One was spun off by majority owner CBS Corporation (one of two successors to the first Viacom, which acquired the first CBS Corporation in 1999) to The Gores Group in 2007. On October 21, 2011, Dial Global—a subsidiary of Oaktree Capital Management's Triton Media Group—acquired the majority of Westwood One's assets, including the distribution rights to NBC News Radio; this resulted in a wholesale re-branding of Westwood One programming. Dial Global announced on March 2, 2012, that it would end distribution of CNN Radio newscasts and make NBC News Radio a full-time operation, with a majority of CNN affiliates switching to NBC. The new format consisted of twice-hourly newscasts. By September 2012, NBC Sports Radio was launched as a joint venture between NBC Sports and Dial Global.

With Cumulus Media acquiring Dial Global and amid plans to merge it into its own radio network, Dial Global reverted to using the Westwood One name in September 2013. On December 15, 2014, concurrent with the launch of Westwood One News, a white-label news service established with a content-sharing deal with CNN, Westwood One ended production of NBC News Radio newscasts. Failing to sign up enough major-market affiliates, Westwood One ended 24/7 programming on NBC Sports Radio at the end of 2018, and shut down operations outright in March 2020.

Beginning in July 2016, NBCUniversal licensed the name "NBC News Radio" to iHeartMedia, utilizing talent and reporters from iHeartMedia's existing 24/7 News Network, made available to the group's approximately 850 radio stations. The reintroduced service included an hourly newscast along with ancillary specials and longform breaking news coverage.

== Bibliography ==
- Banning, William Peck (1946). Commercial and Broadcasting Pioneer: The WEAF Experiment, 1922–1926 (PDF). Cambridge, Massachusetts: Harvard University Press. Archived (PDF) from the original on January 31, 2023 – via World Radio History.
- Bilby, Kenneth (1986). The General: David Sarnoff and the rise of the communications industry (PDF) (1st ed.). New York, New York: Harper & Row. ISBN 0-06-015568-X. Archived (PDF) from the original on February 1, 2023 – via World Radio History.
- Cox, Jim (2015) [2002]. Say Goodnight, Gracie: The Last Years of Network Radio. Jefferson, N.C.: McFarland. ISBN 978-0-7864-1168-9.
- Cox, Jim (2002). American Radio Networks: A History. Jefferson, N.C.: McFarland. ISBN 0-7864-4192-5. Archived from the original on February 10, 2023.
- Dunning, John (1998). On the Air: The Encyclopedia of Old-Time Radio. New York and Oxford: Oxford University Press. ISBN 0-19-507678-8.
- Lucier, James P. (February 9, 1998). "Jim Bohannon On Air—Radio Talk Show Host". Insight on the News. 14 (5): 15. ISSN 1051-4880. Archived from the original on February 12, 2023 – via Gale Academic Onefile.
