= KFKX =

KFKX may refer to:

- KCVG, a radio station (89.9 FM) licensed to Hastings, Nebraska, which held the KFKX call sign from 1996 to 2016
- KFKX (AM), an AM radio station licensed to Hastings, Nebraska and later Chicago, Illinois, which held the KFKX call sign from 1923 to 1933
