= KDPM =

KDPM may refer to:

- KDPM (FM), a radio station (92.3 FM) licensed to serve Marshall, Texas, United States
- KDPM (Cleveland), a defunct radio station (833 AM) licensed to Cleveland, Ohio, United States, which operated from 1923 to 1926
- KMME, a radio station (100.5 FM) licensed to Cottage Grove, Oregon, United States, which identified as KDPM from 2005 to 2011
