= It Ain't Gonna Rain No Mo' =

1923 song

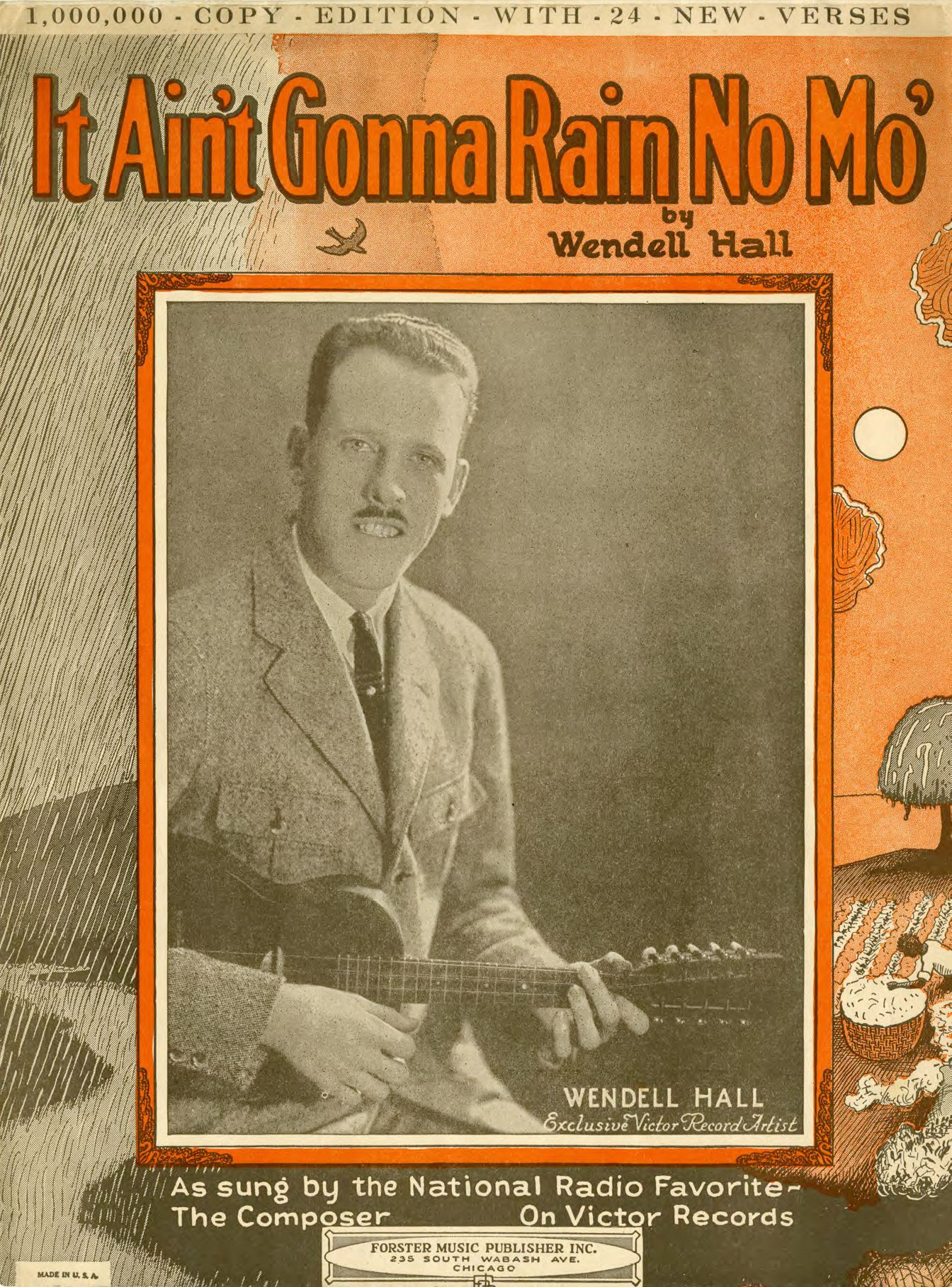
- Sheet music cover

Song
- Written: 1923
- Published: 1923
- Genre: Folk
- Composer: Wendell Hall

Audio sample
- Recording of It Ain't Gonna Rain No Mo', performed by Wendell Hall (1923): file; help

"It Ain't Gonna Rain No Mo'" or "It Ain't Gonna Rain No More" is a folk song first recorded in 1923 by "The Red-Headed Music Maker," the singer and instrumentalist Wendell Hall (1896–1969). Ukulele arrangement on the song was by May Singhi Breen. The recording was a hit in the US and also in Britain, where it was sung during the 1925 FA Cup final by Sheffield United supporters, making it a popular football song of the era.

This song is an example of the folk tradition of transmission with local variants. Antecedents from the 19th century are known. Carl Sandburg suggested that the song goes back at least to the 1870s, and includes verses in his American Songbag (1927). By the 1920s, many variants were already extant in popular culture. Hall most likely codified what already existed and added original verses. His recording sold in excess of two million copies.

The song may be somewhat familiar to modern listeners because of its use in a number of films, especially vintage animated cartoons, typically in the form of a brief vocal refrain, or as an instrumental musical comment. It is featured at the end of a 1930 Pathé Studios cartoon titled Noah Knew His Ark, and part of it is sung in The Plumber, a 1933 Oswald the Lucky Rabbit cartoon. This tradition has continued into modern times: a part of the song was sung in the 2014 film Against the Sun and was also featured over the end credits.

In 1991, Greg & Steve recorded the song, along with "Rain Rain Go Away", for their album Playing Favorites.

In 2019, the song entered the public domain in the United States, and in 2024 sound recordings from 1923 of the song entered the public domain.
