= WMAF (Massachusetts) =

Radio station in South Dartmouth, Massachusetts (1922–1931)

WMAF, known as "The Voice From Way Down East", was a radio broadcasting station licensed to "Colonel" Ned Green's Round Hills Radio Corporation in South Dartmouth, Massachusetts, from September 1922 until 1931. In the summer of 1923 it began rebroadcasting programs originating from station WEAF in New York City, which is generally considered to be first sustained radio network connection in the United States.

Although WMAF was very well-financed and used state-of-the-art equipment, the station had a limited broadcasting career, largely ending its broadcasts after 1928. Even when active it normally operated only during the summer months.

== History ==
=== "Colonel" Ned Green ===
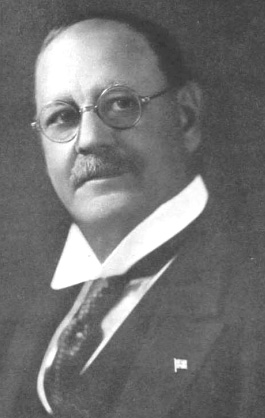
Edward Howland Robinson 'Ned' Green (1923)

WMAF was located on the grounds of "Colonel" Ned Green's Round Hills estate overlooking Buzzard's Bay in South Dartmouth, Massachusetts. An heir to his extremely wealthy mother, Henrietta Howland "Hetty" Green, Ned Green was one of the richest persons in the United States, although to avoid paying Massachusetts income taxes he was careful to maintain residences outside the state for the first six months of each year. Green spent much of his time and fortune sponsoring scientific research and development of new technologies that he personally found interesting. He reported that he had an interest in radio (then called "wireless telegraphy") dating back to Guglielmo Marconi's early experimental work in 1896.

One of his projects was the installation of a set of eleven Western Electric loudspeakers on the estate's water tower. (These loudspeakers were so powerful that eventually residents at Nonquitt, 6 miles (9.7 kilometers) distant, complained, and adjustments were made to reduce their volume.) This setup was used to provide entertainment for local residents, at a time when few owned radio receivers. Local residents were welcomed to park their automobiles on the grounds, to listen to entertainment carried by the sound system. The July 12, 1923, Jess Willard and Luis Fripo heavyweight prize fight lured thousands of visitors who listened to the fight broadcast and were also entertained by a local band.

Colonel Green had an artificial leg that made it difficult to walk, so he used a small electric car, which he equipped with a radio receiver, to travel around the estate grounds. He also equipped a second, larger automobile, with a radio receiver and loudspeakers, which was driven to farmhouses and other locations that did not have radio receivers to entertain the residents.

=== Establishment of WMAF ===
On June 28, 1922, the Round Hills Radio Corporation was incorporated under a Massachusetts commercial charter, with Colonel Green as the company president. This initial charter stated that the company's function, in addition to engaging in radio broadcasting, was the sale of radio, telephone and similar equipment. Because the corporation did not actually engage in commercial activities, on August 15, 1923, it was rechartered under the state's charitable and educational statutes, with its mission now described as "for radio experimentation, improving the uses of wireless and scientific experimentation in new devices to further the use of radio, and to broadcast, free of charge, concerts, weather reports, etc."

Colonel Green contracted to have Western Electric and American Telephone & Telegraph Company (AT&T) staff establish a radio facility for both broadcasting purposes and experimental work. A separate building adjacent to the main house was constructed as a combination radio laboratory and broadcasting studio. A transmitting antenna was erected that consisted of two 143-foot (44-meter) tall towers located on either side of this building, which supported the antenna's four 115-foot (35-meter) long wires. In September 1922 the initial license for a broadcasting station with the randomly assigned call sign WMAF was issued to the Round Hills Radio Corporation, transmitting on 360 meters (833 kHz), which was the standard "entertainment" wavelength of the time. That same month the corporation was also issued an Experimental radio station license, with the call sign 1XV. At this time WMAF and 1XV jointly used a 100-watt Western Electric transmitter.

Colonel Green also purchased a 500-watt transmitter, which was the highest power Western Electric offered at the time. In June 1923 a second broadcasting station, with the call sign WSAQ, was briefly licensed to the Round Hills Radio Corporation, using the 100-watt transmitter. However WSAQ's license was deleted just two months later, and subsequently both the 100- and 500-watt transmitters were licensed for use by WMAF.

Publicity Photographs for WMAF (1923)

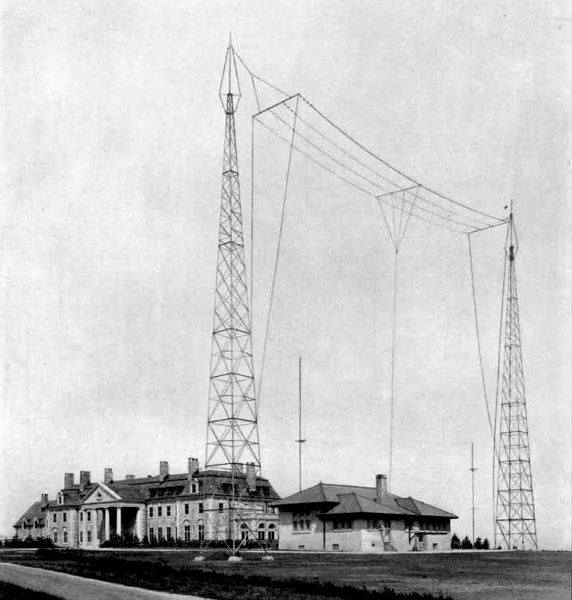
Round Hills estate, with the radio laboratory building and antenna in the background

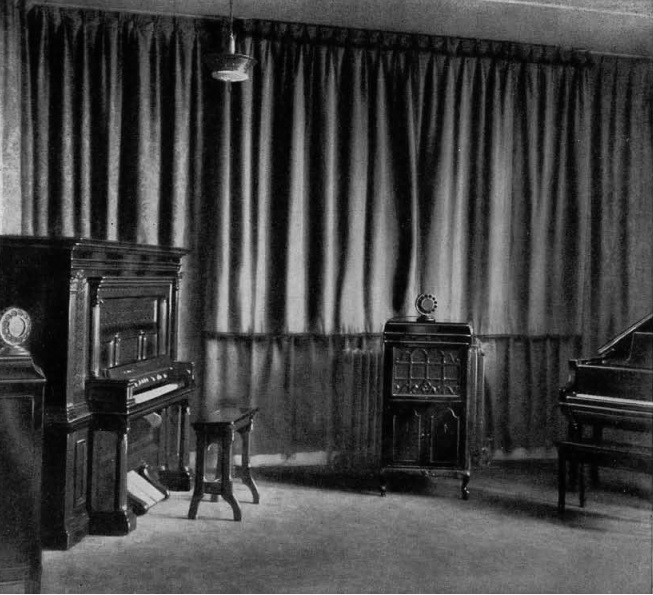
WMAF studio used for local programs

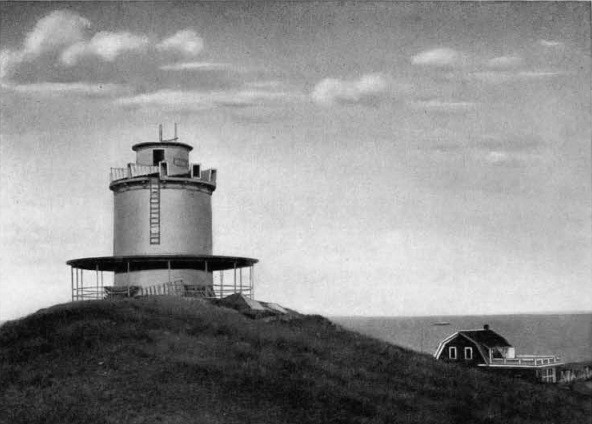
Colonel Green regularly invited the public to drive to his estate to listen to entertainment over a large public address system mounted on a water tower

=== WEAF network link ===
Because the Round Hills estate was located in a sparsely populated section of coastal Massachusetts, there were limited options for providing programming over WMAF. However, Colonel Green was aware that AT&T had run a dedicated telephone line to the New Canaan, Connecticut home of AT&T's president, Harry Thayer, to allow listening to the programming that originated from WEAF, the company's New York City broadcasting station. Colonel Green contacted AT&T's Manager of Broadcasting, William E. Harkness, to arrange for the installation of a similar connection, to be used for rebroadcasting WEAF's programs over WMAF.

WEAF had been founded by AT&T in 1922 as the country's first station designed for selling airtime to advertisers, although it was still in the process of getting established, and most of its schedule consisted of unsponsored "sustaining" programs. Under the terms of the agreement, WMAF would receive commercial programs at no cost, but be charged for the unsponsored programs. The estimated annual cost, including the specially prepared dedicated telephone circuits, was $60,000 a year, although WMAF only operated during the summer months. The arrangement specified that "WMAF's schedule will be 4 to 5:30 p.m. and 7:30 to 10 p.m. each week day and from 3:30 to 5:15 p.m. and 7:15 to 10:00 p.m. on Sundays, Eastern Daylight Saving Time."

AT&T at this time was in the earliest stages of developing a national radio network, and the WMAF link was valuable in providing its engineers with experience in designing the telephone line links needed to make station interconnections. Although on January 4, 1923, AT&T had conducted the first of two one-time joint broadcasts with other stations, this was the first permanent network installation. Engineers from both AT&T and its Western Electric subsidiary aided Colonel Green in setting up the link, which went into operation on July 1, 1923. Station publicity hailed the achievement: "Thus Colonel Green has in effect transported the musical center of America to his radio audience."

The telephone line connection from WEAF had two main segments: an initial circuit from New York City to Providence, Rhode Island, which was connected to a second circuit that ran to Round Hills. After WMAF suspended operations at the end of summer, on October 14, WJAR in Providence took over this network link to WEAF. From this start AT&T would continue to expand its "WEAF chain" network until 1926, when it sold WEAF and the network operations to the Radio Corporation of America, which used the assets to form the core of the National Broadcasting Company's "Red Network".

=== Later years ===
In the summer of 1925, WMAF was operating with 1,000 watts of power, making it one of the stronger stations in the nation, and it was upgraded to a "Class B" station classification and assigned the transmitting frequency of 680 kHz. At this time it also switched to having most of its programming supplied by WGBS in New York City. Because WGBS was only on the air four nights a week, the other three nights its studios were used to produce programs that were carried solely by WMAF.

There was a further change for the summer 1926 broadcasts, when WMAF began carrying programs supplied by WOR in Newark, New Jersey, on Wednesday and Saturday evenings, in addition to Tuesday and Thursday night programs provided by WRNY in New York City. For the summer of 1927 WOR repeated as WMAF's source for programming. That fall, WOR became the flagship station for the newly formed Columbia Broadcasting System (CBS), which debuted on September 18, a few days before WMAF shut down for the season. When WMAF resumed operations in the summer of 1928 it continued as an official CBS outlet.

WMAF ceased making regular broadcasts after the summer of 1928. However, Colonel Green continued his extensive support of groundbreaking scientific work. The radio laboratory was used to explore shortwave phenomena, and provided communication with the Byrd Antarctic Expedition of 1928-30. In addition, both an airfield and dirigible hangar were built on the estate grounds.

Although largely silent, for a time WMAF continued to be licensed and appeared on the official radio station lists. In late October 1930, the Federal Radio Commission (FRC) announced that WMAF was one of fifteen stations that would be deleted at the end of the month if it did not submit an application for license renewal. On October 31 WMAF was one of six stations reportedly deleted for failing to submit the necessary renewal request, however the official action did not take place until June 3 of the next year.
