= Wendell Hall =

American singer-songwriter (1896–1969)

Wendell Woods Hall
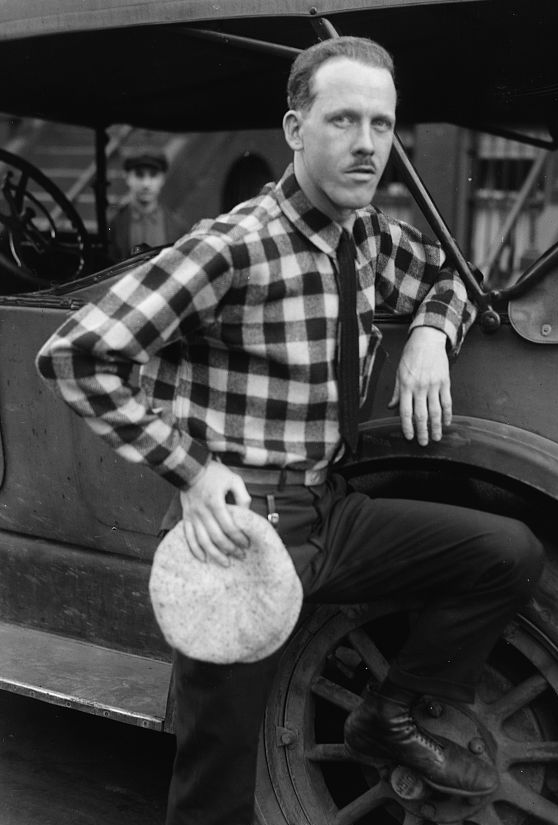
- Wendell Hall in 1920

Background information
- Also known as: Pineapple Picador
- Born: Wendell Woods Hall; August 23, 1896; St. George, Kansas, United States
- Died: April 2, 1969 (aged 72) Fairhope, Alabama, United States
- Genres: Jazz, country, Hawaiian
- Instrument: Ukulele
- Years active: 1920s-1950s

Wendell Woods Hall (August 23, 1896 – April 2, 1969) was an American country singer, vaudeville artist, songwriter, pioneer radio performer, Victor recording artist, and ukulele player.

== Biography ==
Hall was known as the Red-haired Music Maker and the Pineapple Picador in his recording heyday of the 1920s and 1930s. In 1923, he released the song "It Ain't Gonna Rain No Mo'," which sold over two million copies in the United States. It was awarded a gold disc by the RIAA. The song is also considered the first musical hit on radio. He wrote "Underneath the Mellow Moon" and "Carolina Rose". Hall also wrote songs with Carson Robison and Art Gillham.

Hall began his career in 1922 Chicago as a song plugger for Forster Music. He traveled around the country and stopped in towns to play in music stores, theaters, and radio. In vaudeville he began singing and playing the xylophone. He found the ukulele to be more portable and quickly became an expert with that instrument. During 1923, he frequently performed on radio station KYW, then in Chicago. In January, 1924 he signed with the National Carbon Company to host the Eveready Hour a pioneer commercially sponsored variety program on WEAF in New York. On November 4, 1924, the program was on a pre-network 18 station "hook-up" to broadcast election returns with entertainers Will Rogers, Carson Robison, Art Gillham, and the Waldorf Astoria Orchestra. Eveready even painted their batteries with a red top to cash in on Hall's popularity.

Beginning in January, 1929, Hall hosted The Majestic Theater of the Air as producer, program director, and emcee on the CBS radio network. In April, 1929, he introduced singer Harriet Lee on the show as the "Chicago Nightingale", leading to her becoming a hit on CBS. A few years later, Hall hosted Gillette's Community Sing. He made a few musical short films. After his radio days were over, Hall wrote commercials for radio. Beginning in September 1933, Hall had a program on NBC that the F. W. Fitch Company sponsored.

He did some collaborations with Carson Robison, recording versions of Stephen Foster tunes such as "Camptown Races" and "Oh! Susanna." He made many recordings on record labels of the time: Victor, Gennett, QRS, Brunswick.

Hall performed on a variety of stringed instruments, including the standard ukulele, the taropatch ukulele, banjo, and the hybrid banjolele, as well as the 10-string Martin-style tiple. Like so many of the other performers during the era, Hall was a big fan of the instruments created by the C.F. Martin & Company, particularly their Taropatch. Like other performers, he was unsuccessful in obtaining an endorsement deal with Martin, but in response to his letter offering to endorse their product, Martin offered their 20% discount for professional performers and to inlay his name in the head of the instrument.

He published an instruction book, Wendell Hall's Ukulele Method, with Forster Music in 1925, that was edited by May Singhi Breen. He also marketed a series of custom ukuleles through the Regal Musical Instrument Company of Chicago, with his picture on the head of The Red Head Ukulele and banjolele with red tuning pegs that became collector's items for several generations afterward.

When the ukulele dropped in popularity, many performers distanced themselves from it, Hall was no exception. It was not until Arthur Godfrey brought the instrument back to life in the 1950s that it re-emerged. Due to this resurgence, Hall was able to land a radio show on WBKB five days a week. His instruction booklets were updated and republished at that time as well.

== Personal life ==
On June 4, 1924, Hall married Marion Martin. The wedding was performed live on the radio, believed to be the first broadcast ceremony in history.

== Bibliography ==
- Wendell Hall's Ukulele Method, Edited by May Singhi Breen, Forster Music Publisher, Inc., 1925
- Ten Trick Tunes, Forster Music Publisher, Inc., 1926
- Jingle Tunes No. 1, Forster Music Publisher, Inc.,
- Francis Gerald Fritz, Dissertation University of Wisconsin: https://minds.wisconsin.edu/handle/1793/7192

== Sources ==
- Tranquada, Jim (2012). The Ukulele: A History. Honolulu, Hawaii: University of Hawai'i Press. ISBN 9780824836344.
- Whitcomb, Ian (2012). Ukulele Heroes: The Golden Age. Milwaukee, WI: Hal Leonard Books. ISBN 978-1-4584-1654-4.
