= Broadcasting Company of America =

Company

The Broadcasting Company of America (BCA) was a short-lived subsidiary of the American Telephone & Telegraph Company (AT&T). It was formed in May 1926 in order to consolidate AT&T's radio station and network operations into a single organization. However, just two months later AT&T announced that the subsidiary was being sold to the Radio Corporation of America (RCA). This sale took place on November 1, 1926, and RCA reorganized the BCA assets to form the core of National Broadcasting Company's (NBC) network operations, including its "Red Network".

== Early AT&T radio development ==
AT&T had an early interest in radiotelephone development, although initially only as a method for establishing telephone links to locations where it was not possible to string wire lines. Lee de Forest's development of vacuum-tube amplification would prove invaluable for progress in a number of areas. In July 1913 the company spent $50,000 to purchase from the inventor the patent rights for telephone wire amplification, and in 1915 used this innovation to make the first transcontinental telephone calls. In October 1914, the company further purchased the commercial patent rights for radio signaling for $90,000, and in October 1915 conducted test radio transmissions from the Navy's station in Arlington, Virginia, NAA, that were heard as far away as Paris, France and Hawaii.

AT&T's main competitor in the radio field would be the Radio Corporation of America (RCA), which was formed in 1919 as a subsidiary of the General Electric (GE). Because no single company held sufficient patents rights to operate radio systems without infringing on other company's patents, a series of cross-licensing agreements were concluded between a series of companies holding key patents, and on July 1, 1920, AT&T signed a comprehensive agreement with GE. These agreements in effect assigned dominance in specified areas of the radio industry to individual participating companies, which eventually would meet with anti-trust challenges. In addition, conflicting interpretations of some of the pact's clauses by the signatories would lead to numerous disputes, especially between AT&T and the other participants, known collectively as "the radio group".

=== Network operations and the "WEAF chain" ===
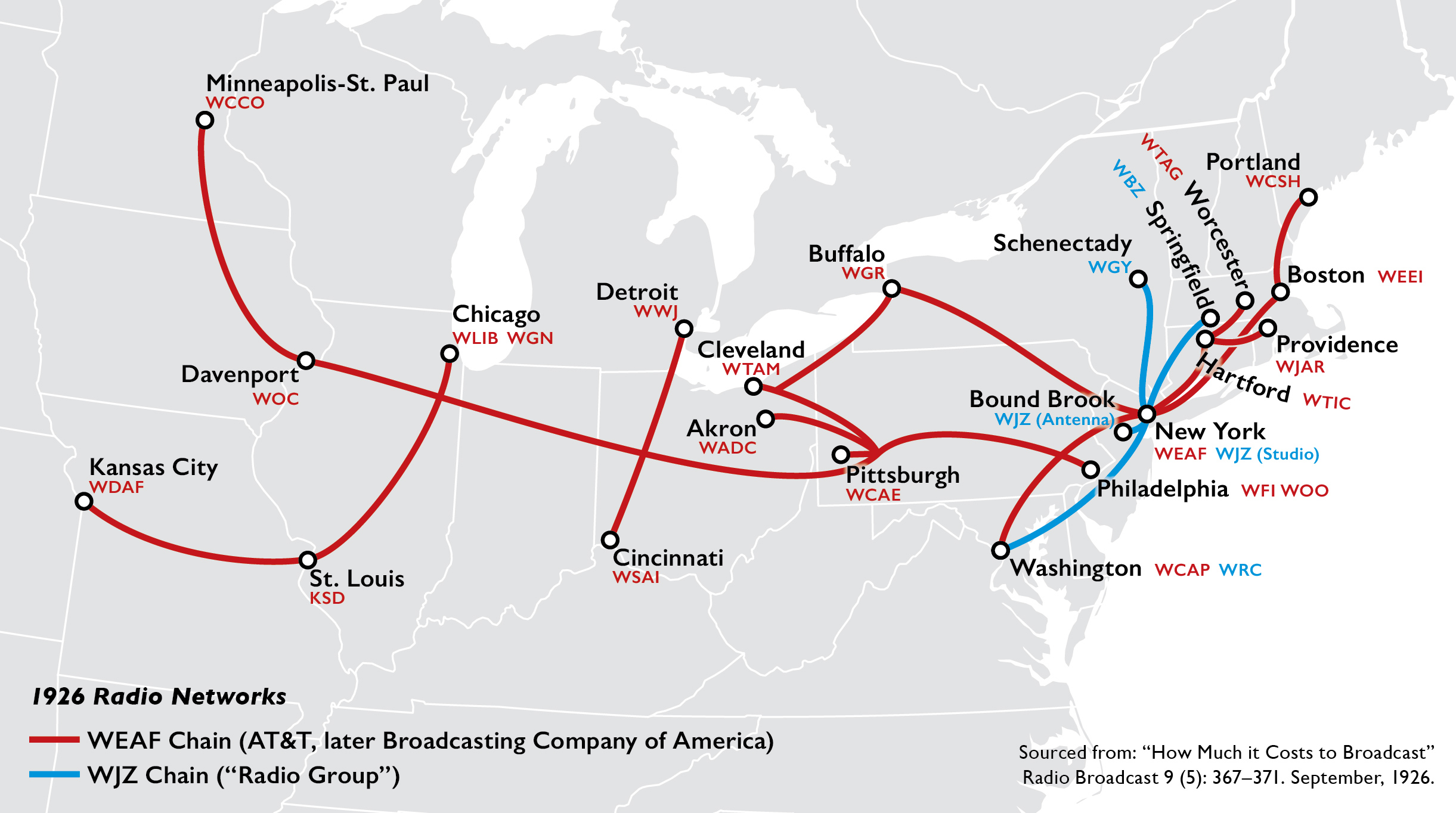
The WEAF and WJZ chains

Organized radio broadcasting was introduced in late 1920 and 1921, and by the end of 1922 there were more than 500 stations throughout the United States. AT&T soon recognized that it had the technical expertise and patent rights needed to play an important, and possibly dominant, role in the industry. As early as December 1921, a memo prepared by two AT&T engineers proposed that the company construct a nationwide radio network, using the company's longlines to connect together individual stations. They also noted that "this service would enable the national and local advertisers, industrial institutions of all kinds, and even individuals if they desire, to send forth information and advertising matter audibly to thousands". AT&T moved quickly to start implementation of its bold plan, and on February 11, 1922, formally announced its intention to develop a "national chain of radio transmitting stations".

A key component of the plan was the construction by AT&T of a well equipped New York City station, WEAF, that was the originating point for the new network, which became known as the "WEAF chain". The first network program was transmitted on January 4, 1923, linking just one additional station, WNAC in Boston, Massachusetts, to WEAF. A more ambitious three-month link began operation on July 1, 1923, when Colonel Edward H. R. Green arranged for AT&T to provide WEAF's programming for rebroadcast by his station, WMAF in South Dartmouth, Massachusetts. The summer of 1923 also saw the opening of WCAP in Washington, D.C., licensed to the Chesapeake and Potomac Telephone Company, an AT&T subsidiary. The resulting New York-to-Washington link was extensively used to gain engineering knowledge in using telephone lines for radio network connections.

Initially WEAF had few advertisers, so most of its schedule consisted of unsponsored "sustaining" programs which network stations had to pay for, although they were not charged for sponsored programs. An important early sponsored program was The Eveready Hour, which debuted over WEAF in December 1923, and began to be carried over a rapidly growing number of stations in early 1924. The first transcontinental link was made in early 1924, and that fall a coast-to-coast network of 23 stations broadcast a speech by President Coolidge. By the end of 1925 there were 26 affiliates in the standard WEAF chain network, extending westward to Kansas City, Missouri.

Reacting to AT&T's actions, RCA quickly began efforts to establish its own network, originating from its New York City station, WJZ, but was badly handicapped in competing effectively. AT&T maintained that the cross-licensing agreements gave it the exclusive right to sell airtime. AT&T also normally refused access to its high-quality telephone lines to competitors, so RCA's efforts generally used telegraph lines to connect stations, which would prove to have inadequate fidelity and reliability. RCA also investigated using high-powered or shortwave stations to establish network connections, but none of these alternatives matched the quality of AT&T's telephone links. Thus, while President Coolidge's March 1925 inauguration was sent over a growing AT&T transcontinental network of 23 stations, the WJZ chain's broadcast of the speech was carried by only four stations, all located in the East.

== Formation of the Broadcasting Company of America ==
On May 11, 1926, AT&T announced that "The radio broadcasting activities heretofore carried on by the radio broadcasting department of the American Telephone and Telegraph Company, under the general designation of WEAF, will be incorporated under the name Broadcasting Company of America." The new company's officers were: President, J. C. Lynch; Vice-president and General Manager, William E. Harkness; Manager of Broadcasting, George F. McClelland; Secretary and Treasurer, F. S. Spring; and Auditor, H. F. McKeon. Operations continued to be based at AT&T headquarters at 195 Broadway in New York City.

Unpublicized at the time were ongoing intense negotiations between AT&T and the radio group companies, led by RCA, about the status of the cross-licensing agreements, and the overall future of the broadcasting industry. AT&T's consolidation of its radio activities into the BCA subsidiary allowed for two possible outcomes: if AT&T decided to withdraw, then the transfer of its radio operations would be simplified, otherwise, the new entity could continue to be run semi-independently of the parent corporation.

During BCA's short existence, the standard WEAF chain configuration consisted of 17 stations, concentrated in the northeastern United States, but also extending westward to WDAF in Kansas City. Individual evening hourly station rates ranged from $170 for three stations located in smaller communities to $480 for flagship WEAF. The standard charge for an hour of evening programming over the entire roster of stations was $4,080, before any applicable discounts.

== BCA sale to the Radio Corporation of America ==
Although the WEAF network operations were profitable and had a bright future, AT&T ultimately decided it was best to withdraw from radio broadcasting. The result was a total of twelve agreements, dated July 1, 1926, but signed six days later, between AT&T and the radio group companies. Included was the sale of BCA's assets, principally WEAF and its associated chain operations, to RCA for $1 million. A key feature of the agreements was that RCA was now cleared to sell airtime to advertisers. Equally important was a pledge by AT&T to make its telephone lines readily available to RCA. A Consolidated Press Association wire service review of the transaction noted that the sum paid reflected WEAF's position in the industry, as it represented a substantial premium over what radio stations were commanding in the marketplace, and estimated that 4/5ths of the purchase price for WEAF represented good-will and the securing of the use of AT&T's lines.

The sale was initially kept secret from the staff and the general public, and did not become publicly known until July 21. AT&T's press release announcing the sale stated that although operation of WEAF and the WEAF chain had been financially successful, the company had concluded that "while the technical principle was similar to that of the telephone system, the objective of the broadcasting station was quite different from that of a telephone system. Consequently, it has seemed to us after years of experimentation, that the broadcasting station which we have built up might be more suitably operated by other interests." WCAP in Washington, which had been sharing time on the same frequency as RCA's station WRC, was now considered redundant, and ceased operating as of August 1. This allowed WRC to begin broadcasting fulltime on the frequency.

On September 13, 1926, RCA's chairman of the board Owen D. Young and president James G. Harbord announced the formation of the National Broadcasting Company, Inc., to begin operations upon RCA's acquisition of WEAF on November 15. WEAF would go on to be the "key station" for the NBC radio "Red Network", which sometimes would still be referred to as the WEAF chain. The leased lines that figured so importantly in the acquisition of BCA would form the backbone for both NBC Red and its sister NBC Blue for the next fifteen years.

== See also ==
- NBC Red Network
