= The Eveready Hour =

1920s radio variety program

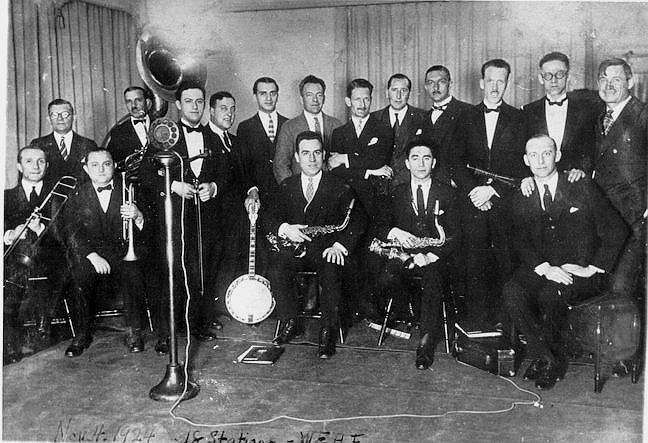
The Eveready Hour's election night broadcast from WEAF to 18 stations on November 4, 1924: Will Rogers (far right), Art Gillham, Wendell Hall, Carson Robison, Eveready Quartet, Graham McNamee and the Waldorf-Astoria Dance Orchestra.

The Eveready Hour was the first commercially sponsored variety program in the history of broadcasting. It premiered December 4, 1923 (or, according to other sources, November 4, 1923, or February 12, 1924), on WEAF Radio in New York City. As radio's first sponsored network program, it was paid for by the National Carbon Company, which at the time owned Eveready Battery. The host for many years was the banjo-playing vocalist Wendell Hall, "The Red Headed Music Maker", who wrote the popular "It Ain't Gonna Rain No Mo'" (Victor Records). Hall was married on The Eveready Hour in 1924.

== History ==
The program started locally on radio station WEAF in New York City in December 1923. The idea for the program came when the National Carbon Company's George Furness tuned in WJZ that summer and heard Edgar White Burrill reading Ida M. Tarbell's He Knew Lincoln. Envisioning the unexplored possibilities of radio programming and advertising, Furness became the producer and supervisor of The Eveready Hour, a show he structured to bring the full spectrum of American culture to the airwaves. Media critic Ben Gross later stated that "Immediately after its première in 1923, it became the most important program in broadcasting."

In early 1924, The Eveready Hour began to be carried simultaneously by a second station, WJAR in Providence, Rhode Island, and the number of outlets was expanded to a group of Eastern and Midwestern stations "as quickly as WEAF could add stations" to its "WEAF chain" radio network. On election night, November 4, 1924, the program, hosted by Wendell Hall, was carried by 18 stations, with Will Rogers, Art Gillham, Carson Robison and the Eveready Quartet entertaining between election returns given by Graham McNamee. Joseph Knecht led the Waldorf-Astoria Dance Orchestra. In 1926 the WEAF chain operations were purchased by the Radio Corporation of America, becoming the basis of the National Broadcasting Company (NBC) in early 1927. The Eveready Hour continued as a featured broadcast on NBC until 1930.

A 1926 Saturday Evening Post advertisement for The Eveready Hour and Eveready Batteries showed a fantasy illustration of radio listeners above the following copy:

Like the fabled ship in which Jason brought home the enchanted fleece of gold, The Eveready Hour brings a rich treasure of entertainment to charm the harbor-homes of its hearers. Inaugurated two years ago, The Eveready Hour was an adventure in broadcasting – an hour of connected entertainment, uninterrupted by the frequent injection of the name of the broadcaster.

Radio has already become a highly specialized art worthy of the most scrupulous code of ethics, and The Eveready Hour represents a sincere effort to pioneer in providing the most acceptable form of radio entertainment.

Eveready programs cover a wide range of entertainment and human interest, transporting us to periods of wholesome simplicity; to barren islands where marooned sailors meet adventure, starvation and death; to battle-scarred France with singing doughboys; to emotional heights by telling with music the stories of the seasons; and to memories of yesteryear aroused by old ballad and musical comedy favorites.

Guests included Lionel Atwill, Arthur "Bugs" Baer, Belle Baker, Eddie Cantor, Pablo Casals, Irvin S. Cobb, Richard Dix, Emma Dunn, Lew Fields, the Flonzaley String Quartet and Laurette Taylor. Directed by Paul Stacey and Douglas Coulter, the show featured an orchestra conducted by Nathaniel Shilkret. In 1924, Charles W. Harrison brought together the Eveready Mixed Quartet, a group that included Harrison, soprano Beulah Gaylord Young (Harrison's wife), contralto Rose Bryant and bass Wilfred Glenn. Tom Griselle provided the piano accompaniment. Harrison also led a male quartet for the radio show.

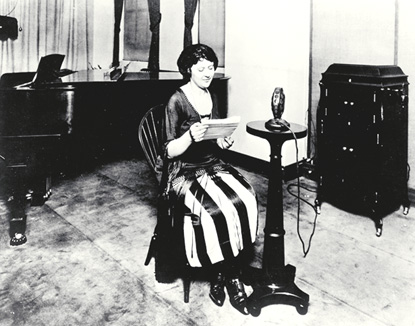
Announcer Helen Hahn in the WEAF studio in 1922

The songwriter Yip Harburg was involved in several shows as indicated by existing scripts:

- The Mayor of Hogan's Alley ("Eveready Hour," CBS radio, 1929 Feb 19) Typed script of one-act musical play; music by Jay Gorney and Henry Souvaine [with script by E.Y. Harburg]. – 27 pages.
- How's the Judge[?] ("Eveready Hour," CBS radio, 1929 May 14) Typed script of one-act musical play; music by Jay Gorney and Henry Souvaine [with script by E.Y. Harburg]. – 27 pages.
- For Dear Old Delta ("Eveready Hour," CBS radio [1929]) Typed script of one-act musical play; music by Jay Gorney and Henry Souvaine [with script by E.Y. Harburg]. – 29 pages.

=== Surviving recordings ===
The only known recording of an Eveready Hour broadcast was made by an engineer at the Edison Laboratory in West Orange, New Jersey, on the evening of May 15, 1928, from the over-the-air signal of station WEAF. This remarkably clear recording contains a local announcement by a WEAF staff announcer, Paul Dumont, and then the first 18 minutes of the hour-long broadcast. This same recording holds the distinction of being the earliest known aircheck (off-air recording) of a live dramatic radio broadcast. In other words, it was a recording of a radio transmission that was not a news event, speech, or music-only presentation. This rare recording is now archived at the Edison National History Site (ENHS), which is part of the National Park Service.

== Listen to ==
- Thomas Edison's Attic: Blues singer Martha Copeland sings on The Eveready Hour (May 15, 1928)
