= WCAP (Washington, D.C.) =

Radio station in Washington, D.C. (1923–1926)

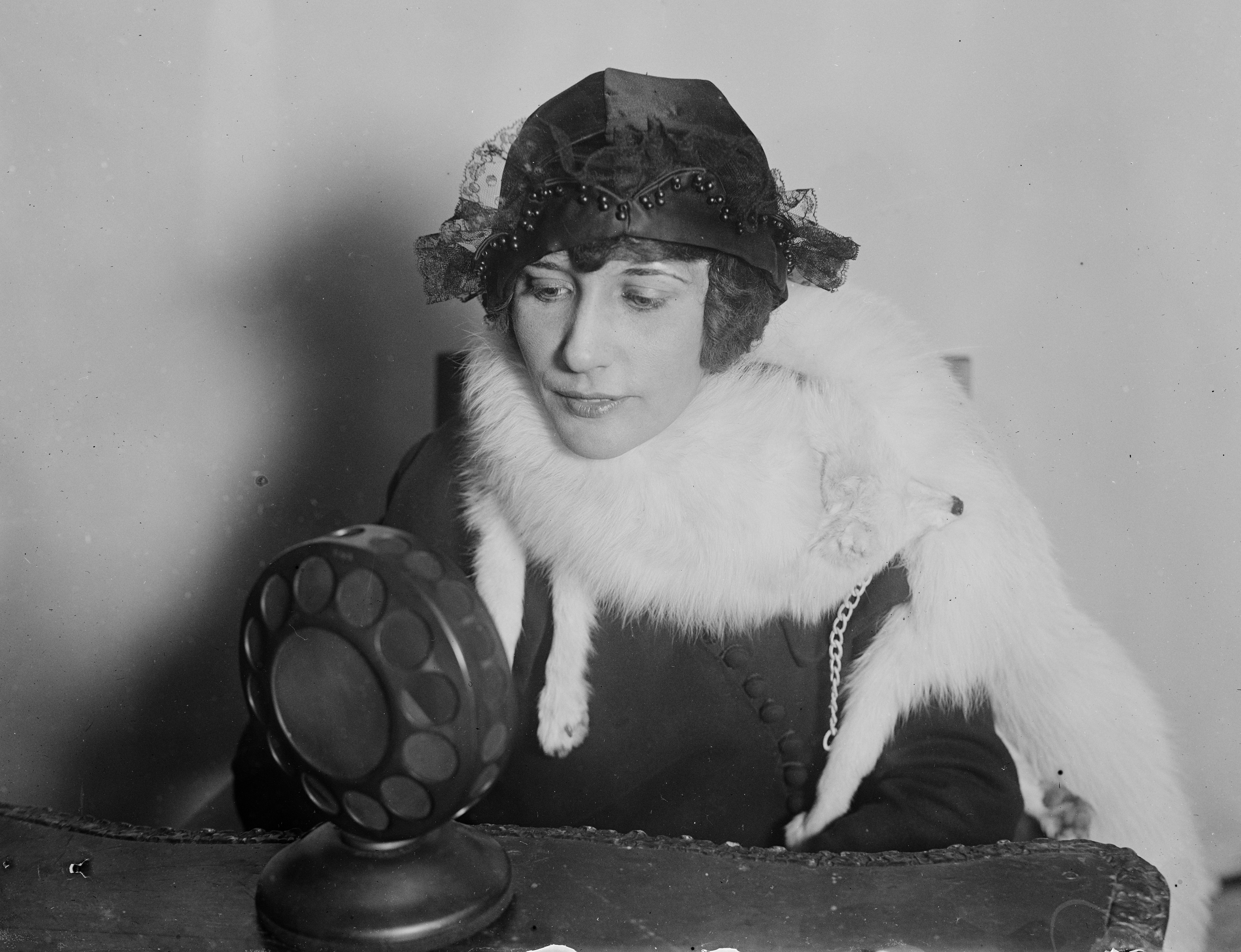
Viola Hudson broadcasts Valentine greetings over WCAP in February 1924

WCAP was a short-lived radio station located in Washington, D.C. during the mid-1920s. It was initially licensed in mid-1923 to the Chesapeake and Potomac Telephone Company (C&P), and its call letters were chosen to reflect the station owner. C&P was controlled by the American Telephone & Telegraph Company (AT&T), and the station was the second of two, following WEAF in New York City, that would be established by AT&T. WCAP was high-powered "Class B" station, and it shared time on the 640 AM frequency with WRC, owned by the Radio Corporation of America (RCA).

On May 11, 1926, AT&T announced that a subsidiary, the Broadcasting Company of America (BCA), had been formed to take over its radio broadcasting assets, including WCAP. Two months later AT&T signed an agreement to sell its BCA subsidiary to RCA for $1 million. Because there was no need for RCA to continue operation of two Washington stations, WCAP ceased broadcasting on July 31, 1926, with its hours ceded to WRC.
