= KFKX (AM) =

Radio station in Hastings, Nebraska, and Chicago, Illinois (1923–1933)

KFKX was an AM radio station, first licensed in 1923 to the Westinghouse Electric and Manufacturing Company for operation in Hastings, Nebraska. It was initially used to test the practicality of linking together a national radio network using shortwave transmissions. This approach proved to be inferior to networking using specially prepared telephone lines, and the shortwave project was terminated in late 1926.

The station was then briefly operated by the National Broadcasting Company, in order to evaluate its potential as an affiliate of the recently established NBC radio network, but the station was determined to be unprofitable. In 1927 KFKX was transferred to Chicago, Illinois, now as a joint operation with Westinghouse's KYW, also located in that city. In 1928 these two stations were formally consolidated as KYW-KFKX, with the KFKX call sign used until 1930 for agricultural-oriented programming. In 1933 the KFKX call sign was eliminated, with the Chicago station becoming just KYW.

== History ==
=== Operation in Hastings, Nebraska (1923–1927) ===
In November 1920 the Westinghouse Electric and Manufacturing Company began operation of a radio broadcasting station, KDKA, in East Pittsburgh, Pennsylvania. The company became interested in linking various stations together for simultaneous network programming, but wanted to avoid the expense of leasing long-distance telephone lines. It was decided to test the practicality of using shortwave transmissions for distributing programming originating at KDKA. Beginning on March 4, 1923, in addition to its normal operation on 360 meters (833 kHz), KDKA transmitted on shortwave wavelengths from 80 to 100 meters (3,750 to 3,000 kHz), for local rebroadcasts on 360 meters by Westinghouse's station in Cleveland, Ohio, KDPM.

The shortwave relay to KDPM was judged to be successful. However, Westinghouse was interested in nationwide distribution, and decided to move its relay target to the geographical center of the United States. On September 29, 1923, KFKX was licensed in Hastings, Nebraska, initially broadcasting on 1050 kHz. The station's call letters were randomly assigned from an alphabetical roster of available call signs.

KFKX made its debut broadcast on November 15, 1923, featuring a mixture of programs received from KDKA, as well as offerings from a locally constructed studio. In addition to its broadcasts on the standard AM band, KFKX was equipped with a shortwave transmitter, which allowed it to relay KDKA programs for reception as far away as the Pacific coast. The town of Hastings was excited to have its own radio station, and local groups and citizens agreed to build studios in the Stitt Building and provide electrical service, worth about $1,200 annually, without charge. In addition to general programs rebroadcast from KDKA, KFKX featured local programming geared toward agricultural communities, and the U.S Department of Agriculture credited the station with "distributing our information from the Great Plains States into many areas not heretofore reached by radio".

In May 1923, the Department of Commerce, which regulated radio at this time, had set aside a band of "Class B" frequencies for use by high-powered stations with superior programming. This included an allocation of 880 kHz for the Lincoln, Nebraska region. In early 1924 KFKX was assigned to this frequency, although a few months later it was assigned to a second Class B frequency, 1030 kHz, and in early 1925 it was transferred to a third, 1040 kHz.

When Westinghouse began operating the experimental shortwave link to KFKX, company engineers identified two main potential benefits over telephone line links: "The costs of construction, maintenance, and operation of a high-frequency system of radio repeating is far below that of wire lines", plus "The performance is also infinitely better from the standpoint of distortion of audio signal transmitted", "thereby greatly improving the quality of transmission". However, it was ultimately determined the use of shortwave transmissions, which were subject to occasional unreliability, as well as significant fading, was actually inferior to using specially prepared telephone line connections. Therefore, the shortwave transmissions were ended in late 1926.

From 1925 until late 1926, KFKX was a relay station located Hastings, Nebraska.

On January 10, 1927, the National Broadcasting Company took over management of KFKX, and NBC president M. H. Aylesworth was quoted as saying "The Nebraska station will be made the experimental center of a service specially adapted to the needs of the great farming communities of the United States", and that "radio is both a vital service to the home and to the farming industry". However, NBC management soon determined that operating a major station in a sparsely settled region was unsustainable. On May 31, 1927, without any prior notice, Westinghouse management ordered that the Hastings operation be immediately shut down, and the station equipment dismantled. An NBC employee further explained that the station had been found to be commercially unprofitable. KFKX's closing required the Agricultural Department to shift some of its daily reports to KMMJ in Clay Center, Nebraska.

In early 1927, the newly formed Federal Radio Commission (FRC) assumed regulation of radio in the United States. Although currently silent, effective June 15, 1927 KFKX was reassigned to 570 kHz, on a timesharing basis with Westinghouse's KYW, then located in Chicago.

=== Transfer to Chicago (1927) ===
A short time after shutting down the Hastings facilities, KFKX's operations were moved to 508 Michigan Avenue in Chicago. Westinghouse now controlled two stations in addition to KFKX in the Chicago area: KYW and WEBH, and on September 1, 1928, the FRC ordered that their stations should be consolidated. WEBH was deleted, and on October 1, 1928, the other two stations were merged under the dual call sign of KYW-KFKX, with the notification that "both calls to be used".

On November 11, 1928, under the provisions of a major reallocation resulting from the FRC's General Order 40, KYW-KFKX became the country's only station assigned for operation on the "clear channel" frequency of 1020 kHz.

=== KFKX call sign deletion (1933) and later use ===
Until about 1930, Westinghouse's broadcasts from its Chicago station used the KYW call letters for most broadcasts, with KFKX used for agricultural programming, such as the Department of Agriculture's "farm radio service" program. However, on May 15, 1933, the FRC requested that stations with dual-call signs that were using only one of their assigned call letters drop ones that were no longer in regular use. As a consequence, the KFKX call letters were eliminated from KYW-KFKX, with the station reverting to just KYW.

In 1996, Hastings College began operation of an Educational FM station. This station was initially assigned the historical KFKX call letters, although it changed to KCVG in 2016.
