= May Singhi Breen =

American musical artist (1891–1970)

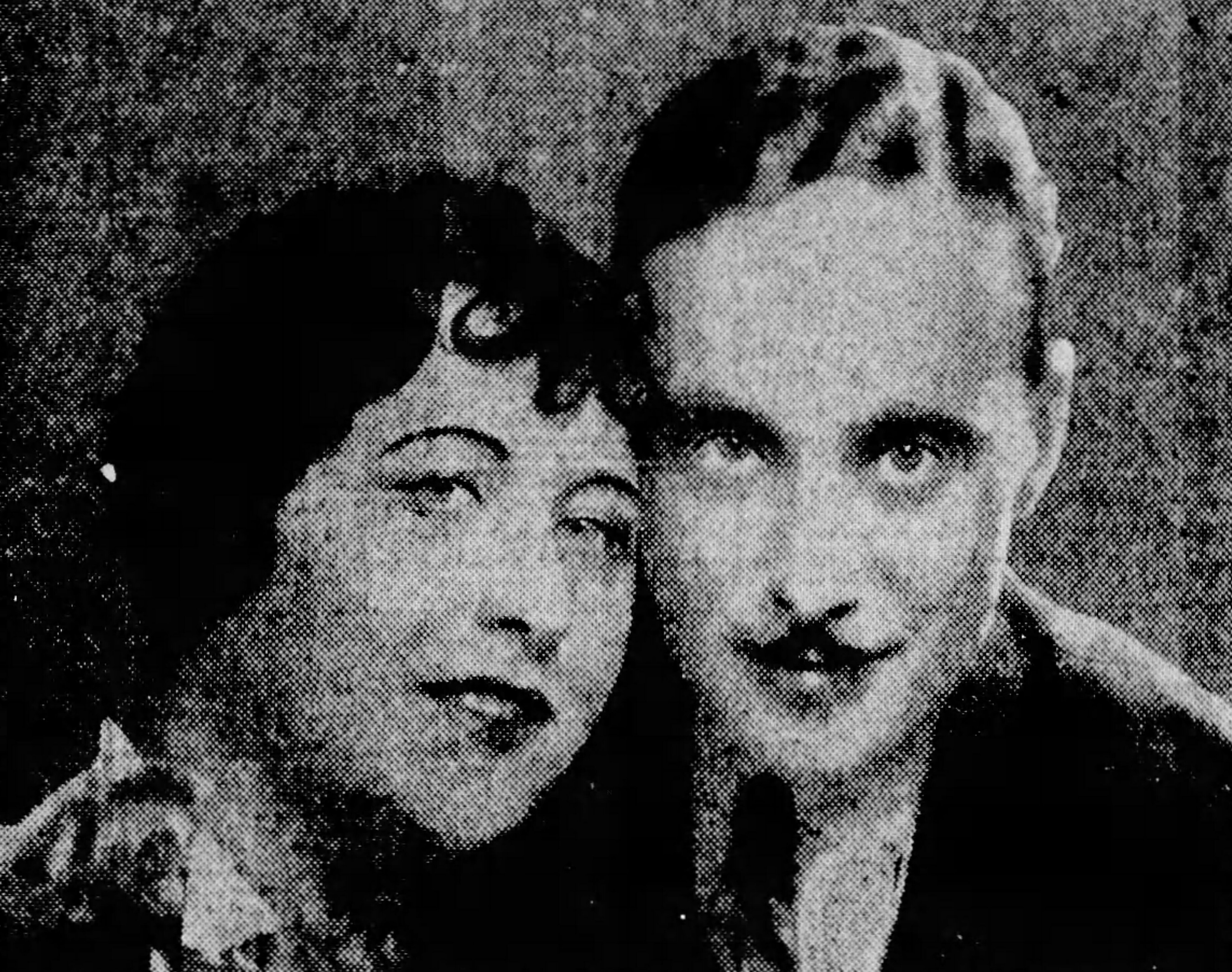
- Breen (left) with Peter DeRose, c. 1929

Background information
- Also known as: Ukulele Lady
- Born: May W. Singhi; February 24, 1891; New York City, U.S.
- Died: December 19, 1970 (aged 79) Neptune Township, New Jersey, U.S.
- Genres: Jazz, blues, Hawaiian
- Instrument: Ukulele
- Label: Victor

May Singhi Breen (née May W. Singhi; February 24, 1891 – 19 December 1970) was an American composer, arranger, and ukulelist, who became known as "The Original Ukulele Lady". Her work in the music publishing business spanned several decades. Breen was the driving force in getting the ukulele accepted as a musical instrument by the American Federation of Musicians. In 2000, she became the first woman inducted into the Ukulele Hall of Fame.

== Beginnings ==
Breen was given an inexpensive ukulele as a Christmas present. Being unable to exchange it, she took lessons and learned to play it. Before long she and some of her friends formed The Syncopators and played radio stations in the New York area. In 1923 Breen met Peter DeRose and left the Syncopators. Together the two were the "Sweethearts of the Air", a radio show that ran for 16 years from 1923-1939, on NBC Blue Network affiliate WJZ in New York where Breen played ukulele and DeRose accompanying her on the piano.

Like so many performers during the era, Breen was a big fan of the instruments created by the C. F. Martin & Company and used a variety of their products, including a couple of custom inlaid models. Like all of the other performers who had tried, Breen was unsuccessful in obtaining an endorsement deal with Martin. Unlike the others, she did not seek another endorsement deal, she liked her Martin instruments too much.

== Publishing ==
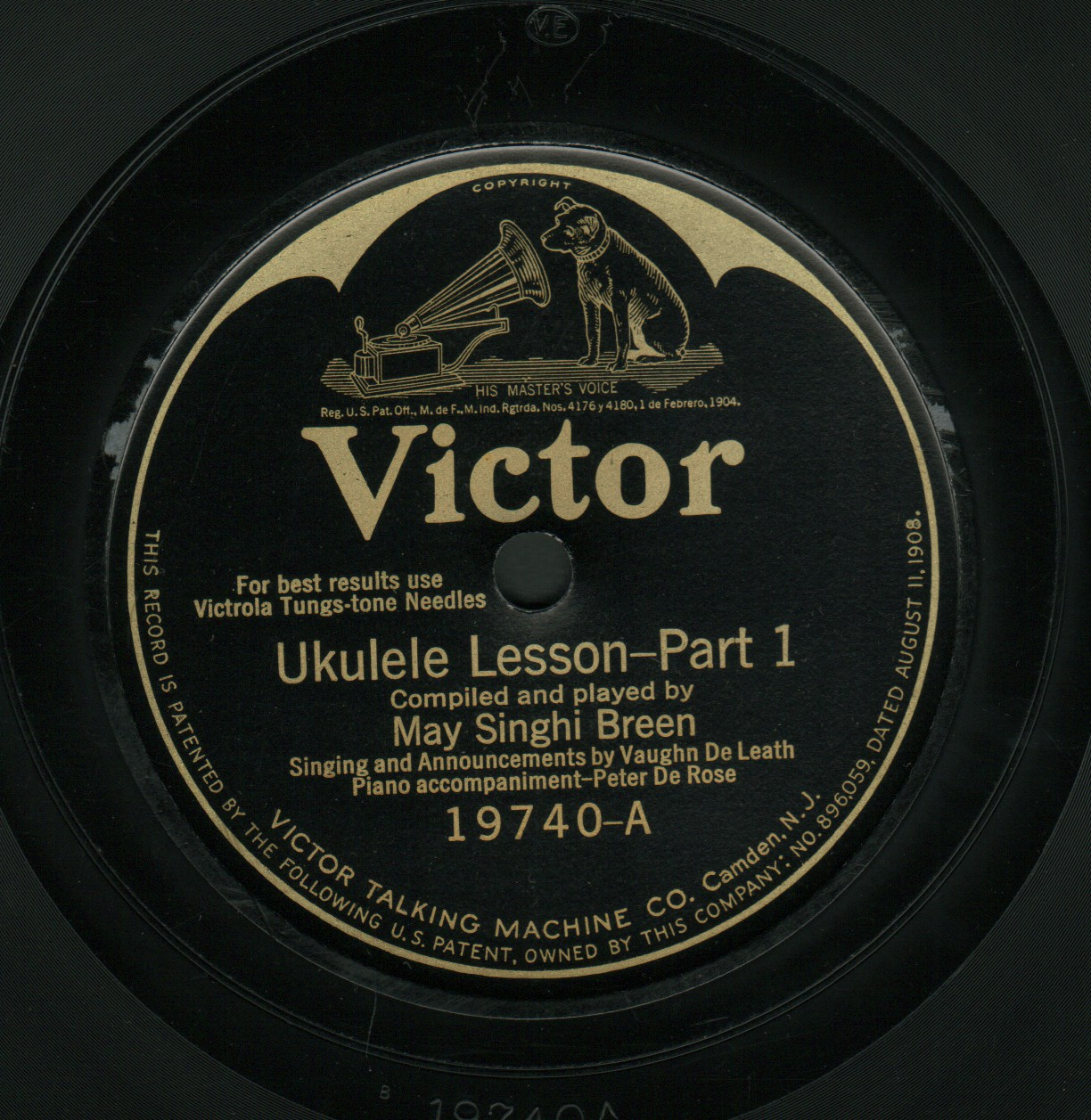
"Ukulele Lesson" 78 rpm disc label

Breen is credited with convincing publishers to include ukulele chords on their sheet music. The Tin Pan Alley publishers hired her to arrange the chords and her name is on hundreds of examples of music from the 1920s on. Her name appears as a music arranger on more pieces than any other individual. Her earliest known credit for a ukulele arrangement was in 1917, but her arrangements began to appear in large numbers in 1923.

Breen issued the first recorded ukulele lesson, a 78 rpm record entitled Ukulele Lesson that came with the Peter Pan Uke Method book, which gave a 6-minute ukulele tutorial on the Victor Label. (The lesson was narrated and sung by popular vocalist Vaughn De Leath.) Building on the popularity of the instrument as promoted by radio and television personality Arthur Godfrey, Breen published the New Ukulele Method in 1950.

In 2000, May Singhi Breen was inducted into the Ukulele Hall of Fame along with Cliff Edwards and the founder of Kamaka Ukulele, Sam Kamaka. Her citation reads in part: "She convinced music publishers of the commercial value of ukulele arrangements and pioneered the inclusion of arrangements on almost all printed copies of popular music. Her own arrangements appear on more pieces of sheet music than those of any other single person in history."

== American Federation of Musicians ==
Breen worked hard to get the American Federation of Musicians to accept ukulele players into their union. In 1931, she approached the Manhattan Local Musicians Union for membership, but was refused, as they would not recognize the ukulele as a musical instrument. In the refusal the representative told her that the ukulele was considered a "fun toy which isn't allowed in orchestras, and anyone can make a noise on it in a matter of days ... it was simply a novelty contraption...". While the union relented and allowed that the ukulele was an instrument, they would not accept ability with it as qualification for membership. They refused for many years, but eventually, under her constant pressure with the support of such notable players as Cliff Edwards and Arthur Godfrey, the individual chapters relented.

== Endorsements ==
The Progressive Musical Instrument Corporation (P'MiCo) was a distributor that included the May Singhi Breen autographed model banjo uke in their line in the 1940s.

== Personal life ==
Her father, Henry U. Singhi (1862–1946) was a builder and her mother, Carrie J. Carroll (maiden; 1862–1915) was a pianist. May married an attorney, Matthew Vincent Breen (1890–1928), in Manhattan on August 7, 1913. They divorced in May 1917 in Manhattan. Thereafter, May and her daughter, Rita, were on their own for twelve years, albeit with the help of child support payments from Matthew Breen. On December 8, 1929 — seventeen months after her ex-husband was killed in Battery Park — May married composer Peter DeRose (1900–1953), a man nine years younger, in Manhattan. May and Peter remained married and collaborated in music until his death. Breen died on December 19, 1970, and is buried next to DeRose in Kensico Cemetery, in Valhalla, New York.

Her daughter, Rita Lherie Breen (1914–2007), married a 1932 West Point graduate, Byram Arnold Bunch (1907–1981) on October 29, 1933, in Manhattan. Many unexpired copyrighted works of May and Peter DeRose are held by the successors under Rita's estate, through her son, RDML Peter Arnold Bunch, USCG, Retired (1937–2004), who predeceased her.

== Selected publications ==
- Wendell Hall's Ukulele Method, by Wendell Hall, edited by May Singhi Breen, Forster Music Publisher, Inc. (1925); OCLC 45322896
- May Singhi Breen's Ukulele Songs and Method, William J. Smith Co. (1924)
- The Peter Pan Uke Method, Uke Trades Publishing Company (1925)
- Islander Uke: Self-Teaching Method, by May Singhi Breen, French American Reeds Manufacturing, (1951); OCLC 71827582
- Sparkle Plenty's Own Self Teaching Ukette Method (comic book, for kids), by May Singhi Breen (1951)
- New Ukulele Method For Beginners And Advanced Students, by May Singhi Breen, Robbins Music Corp. (1950); OCLC 2733204, 8755904
- Collection of Ukulele Solos, by May Singhi Breen, Robbins Music Corp. (1955); OCLC 10987129
