= KCVG =

Bott Radio Network station in Hastings, Nebraska, United States

- Hastings, Nebraska; United States
- Broadcast area: Hastings and Grand Island
- Frequency: 89.9 MHz

Programming
- Format: Christian radio

Ownership
- Owner: Bott Radio Network; (Community Broadcasting, Inc.)

History
- Former call signs: KFKX (1996–2016)
- Former frequencies: 90.1 MHz (1997–2017)
- Call sign meaning: Christian Voice of Grand Island (CV is used in many Bott callsigns)

Technical information
- Licensing authority: FCC
- Facility ID: 78448
- Class: C3
- ERP: 16,000 watts
- HAAT: 122 meters (400 ft)
- Transmitter coordinates: 40°47′11″N 98°22′1.2″W

Links
- Public license information: Public file; LMS

KCVG (89.9 FM) is a radio station licensed to Hastings, Nebraska, United States. The station serves the Hastings and Grand Island areas. The station is owned and operated by the Bott Radio Network and carries its Christian radio format.

== History ==
The station debuted in 1996, as KFKX on 90.1 MHz, licensed to Hastings College. The call sign was the same as the original KFKX, an AM station in Hastings established in 1923 by the Westinghouse Electric and Manufacturing Company, in order to test shortwave retransmission links. The original KFKX ended Hastings operations in 1927, after which it was transferred to Chicago, and its call sign deleted in 1933.

Hastings College announced on May 4, 2016, that it would shut down KFKX on June 30. In its decision, the college cited the station's insufficient listenership and a declining number of jobs in the radio industry. KFKX's studios would continue to be used for podcasts and an Internet radio stream.

Effective November 1, 2016, Hastings College sold KFKX to Bott Radio Network for $37,500. The station changed its call sign to KCVG on November 8, 2016. KCVG moved its transmitter to a site near Doniphan and became a class C3 station on 89.9 MHz, allowing it to increase power and cover Grand Island. Community Broadcasting put KCVG back on the air on January 11, 2017, with the Bott Radio Network of Christian programs, replacing two translators.
