= KDPM (Cleveland) =

Experimental shortwave radio station in Cleveland, Ohio (1921–1927)

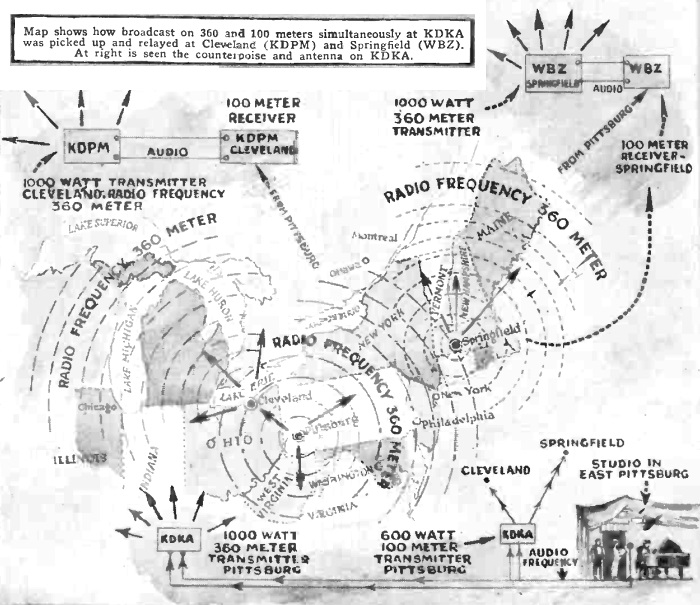
Diagram of shortwave links used by KDKA in East Pittsburgh for rebroadcasts by KDPM in Cleveland and WBZ East Springfield, Massachusetts (1923)

KDPM was a radio station operated by the Westinghouse Electric & Manufacturing Co. It was first licensed, with sequentially issued call letters, in early 1921, and was constructed at the company's Cleveland plant on West 58th Street and Bulkey Boulevard (later Memorial Shoreway). KDPM initially was not a broadcasting station, and instead was used for point-to-point communication with Westinghouse's headquarters at East Pittsburgh, Pennsylvania.

In the early 1920s Westinghouse established a number of broadcasting stations. The company was interested in linking them together for simultaneous network programming, but wanted to avoid the expense of leasing long-distance telephone lines. It was decided to test the use of shortwave transmissions, to distribute programming originating from Westinghouse's KDKA in East Pittsburgh. In early 1923 KDPM was issued an additional authorization to transmit on the standard "entertainment" broadcasting wavelength of 360 meters (833 kHz), and beginning on March 4 it was used as the primary station for the initial tests.

For these tests KDKA, in addition to its normal operation on 360 meters, transmitted on shortwave wavelengths from 80 to 100 meters (3750 to 3000 kHz), for local rebroadcasts on 360 meters by both KDPM and WBZ in East Springfield, Massachusetts. During its time as a broadcasting station, almost all of KDPM's programming originated at KDKA.

The shortwave relay used by KDPM was judged to be successful, however Westinghouse soon decided to move its relay target to the geographical center of the United States, and switched to a newly constructed station, KFKX in Hastings, Nebraska. KDPM reverted to its original use for company interplant communication, although its authorization for entertainment broadcasts was not formally removed until early 1926. The station soon ended its remaining operations, and was removed in late 1927.
