= 1912 United States presidential election in Nebraska =

- November 5, 1912

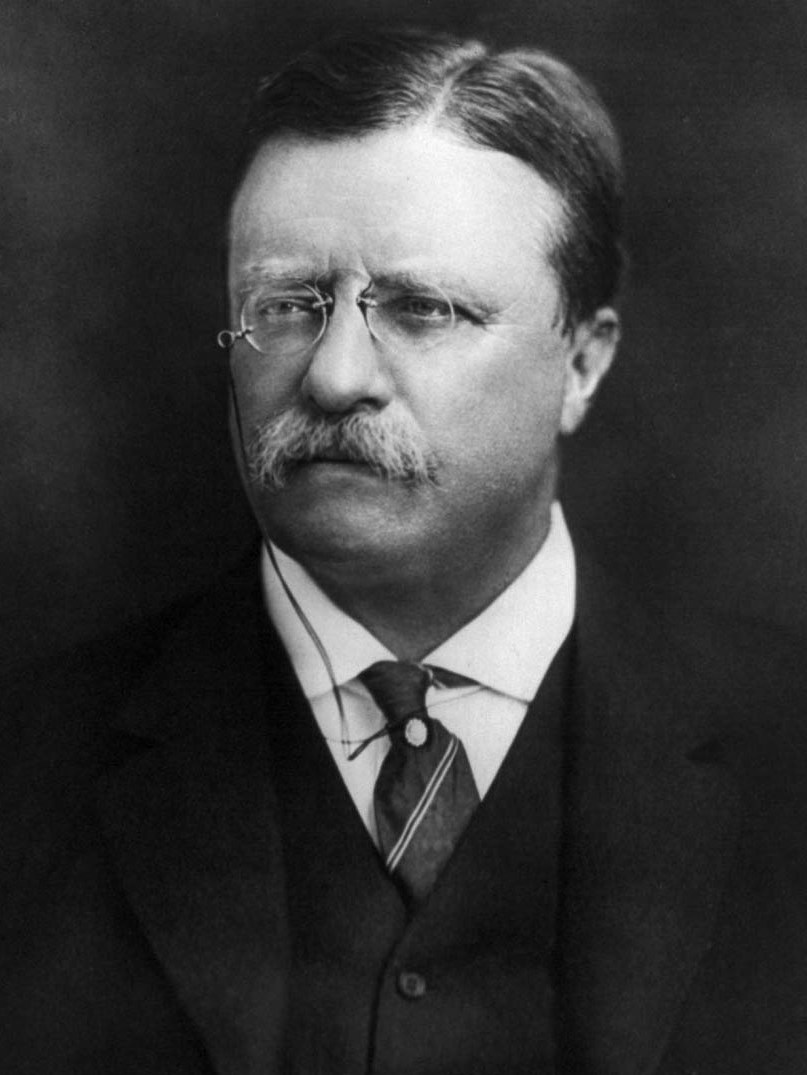

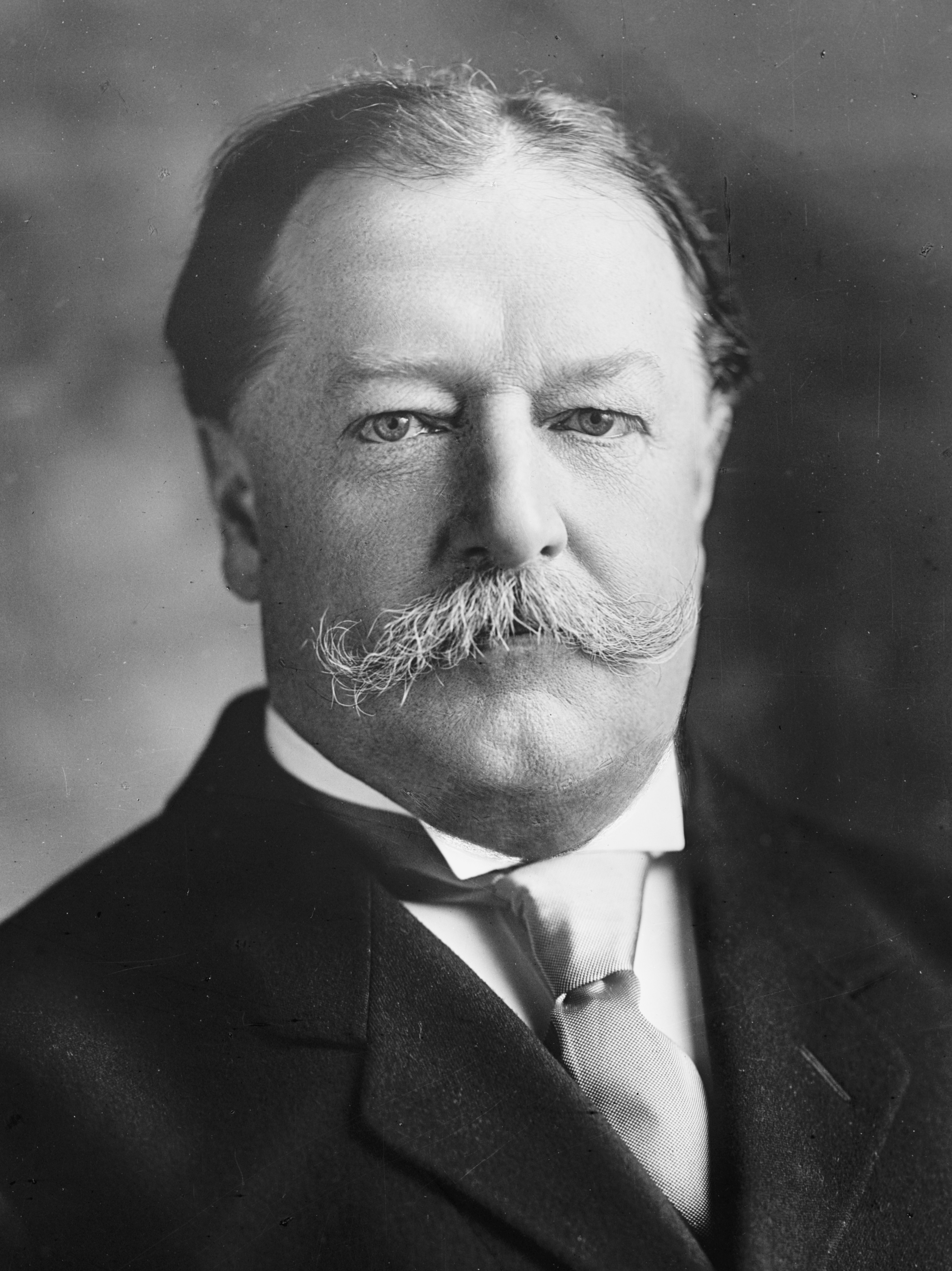
Nominee	Woodrow Wilson	Theodore Roosevelt	William Howard Taft
Party	Democratic	Progressive	Republican
Home state	New Jersey	New York	Ohio
Running mate	Thomas R. Marshall	Hiram Johnson	Nicholas Murray Butler
Electoral vote	8	0	0
Popular vote	109,008	72,681	54,226
Percentage	43.69%	29.13%	21.74%
County results
Wilson
30–40%
40–50%
50–60%
Roosevelt
30–40%
40–50%
50–60%
Taft
30–40%
President before election
William Howard Taft
Republican
Elected President
Woodrow Wilson
Democratic

The 1912 United States presidential election in Nebraska took place on November 5, 1912, as part of the 1912 United States presidential election. Voters chose eight representatives, or electors, to the Electoral College, who voted for president and vice president.

Nebraska was won by Princeton University President Woodrow Wilson (D–Virginia), running with governor of Indiana Thomas R. Marshall, with 43.69% of the popular vote, against the 26th president of the United States Theodore Roosevelt (P–New York), running with governor of California Hiram Johnson, with 29.13% of the popular vote and the 27th president of the United States William Howard Taft (R–Ohio), running with Columbia University President Nicholas Murray Butler, with 21.74% of the popular vote. This was the first time in history that a nationally successful Democratic presidential nominee carried Nebraska, as well as only the third occasion that any Democratic nominee carried the state.

== Primaries ==
The first statewide presidential preference primaries were held in Nebraska on April 19, 1912, alongside primaries for other federal and state offices. The Democratic Party ballot included Champ Clark, Judson Harmon, R. G. Ross, and Woodrow Wilson. The People's Independent Party ballot included Wilson. The Prohibition Party ballot included Eugene W. Chafin. The Republican Party ballot included Robert M. La Follette, Theodore Roosevelt, R. G. Ross, and William Howard Taft. The Socialist Party of America ballot included Eugene V. Debs.

Delegates were allocated by congressional district, with each district awarding two delegates, and an additional four delegates elected at large.

=== Democratic Party ===
1912 Nebraska Democratic presidential primary
- April 19, 1912
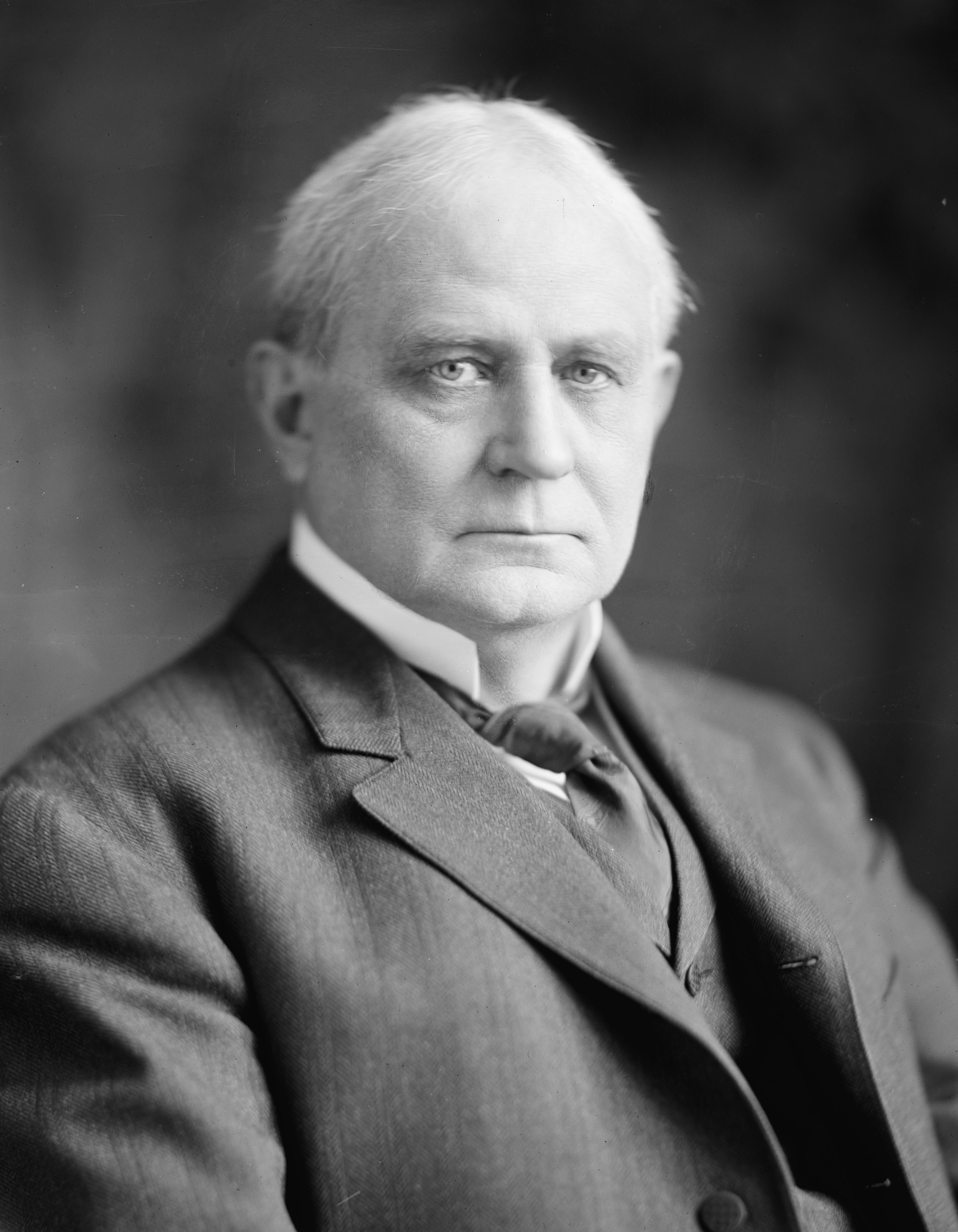

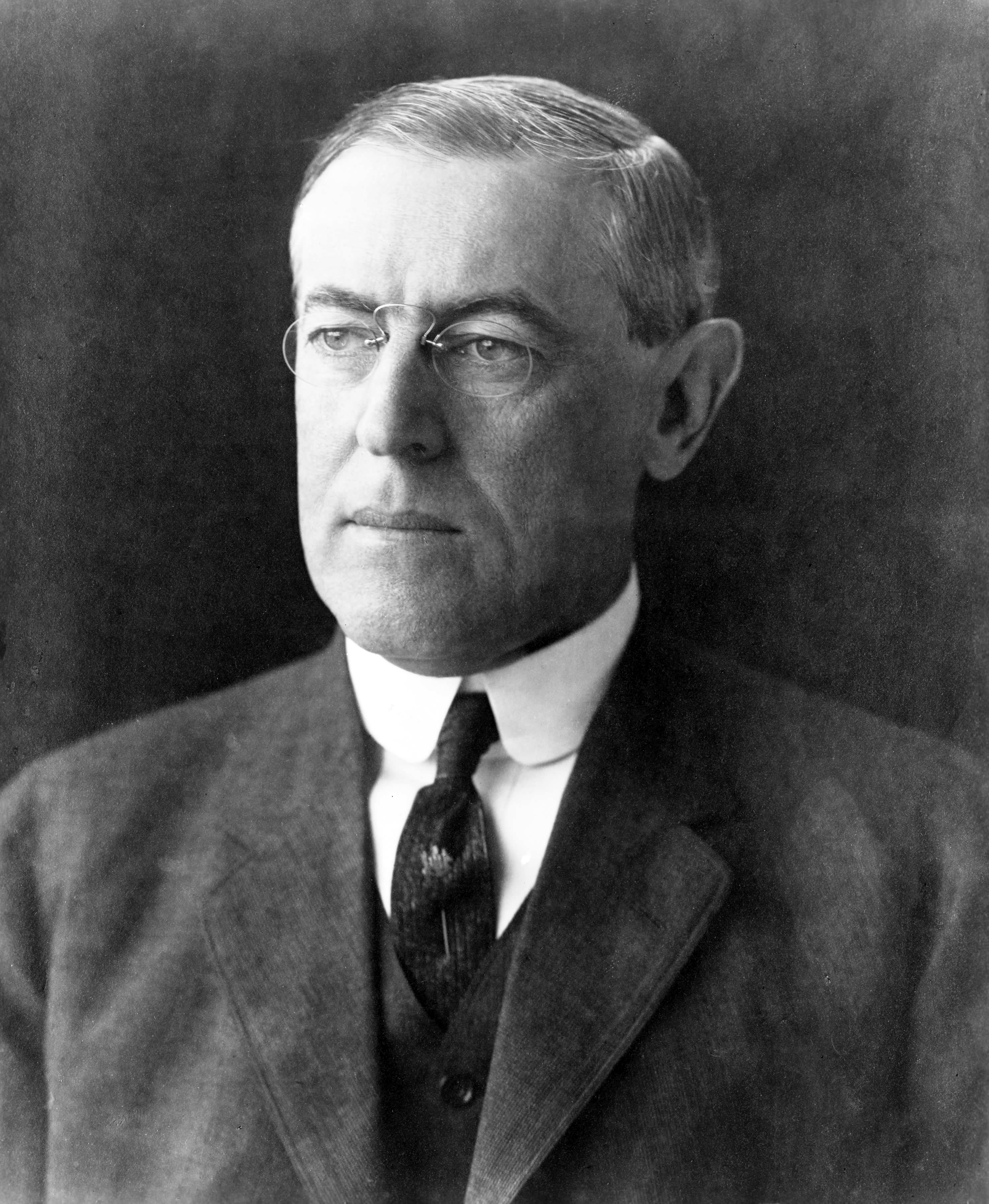

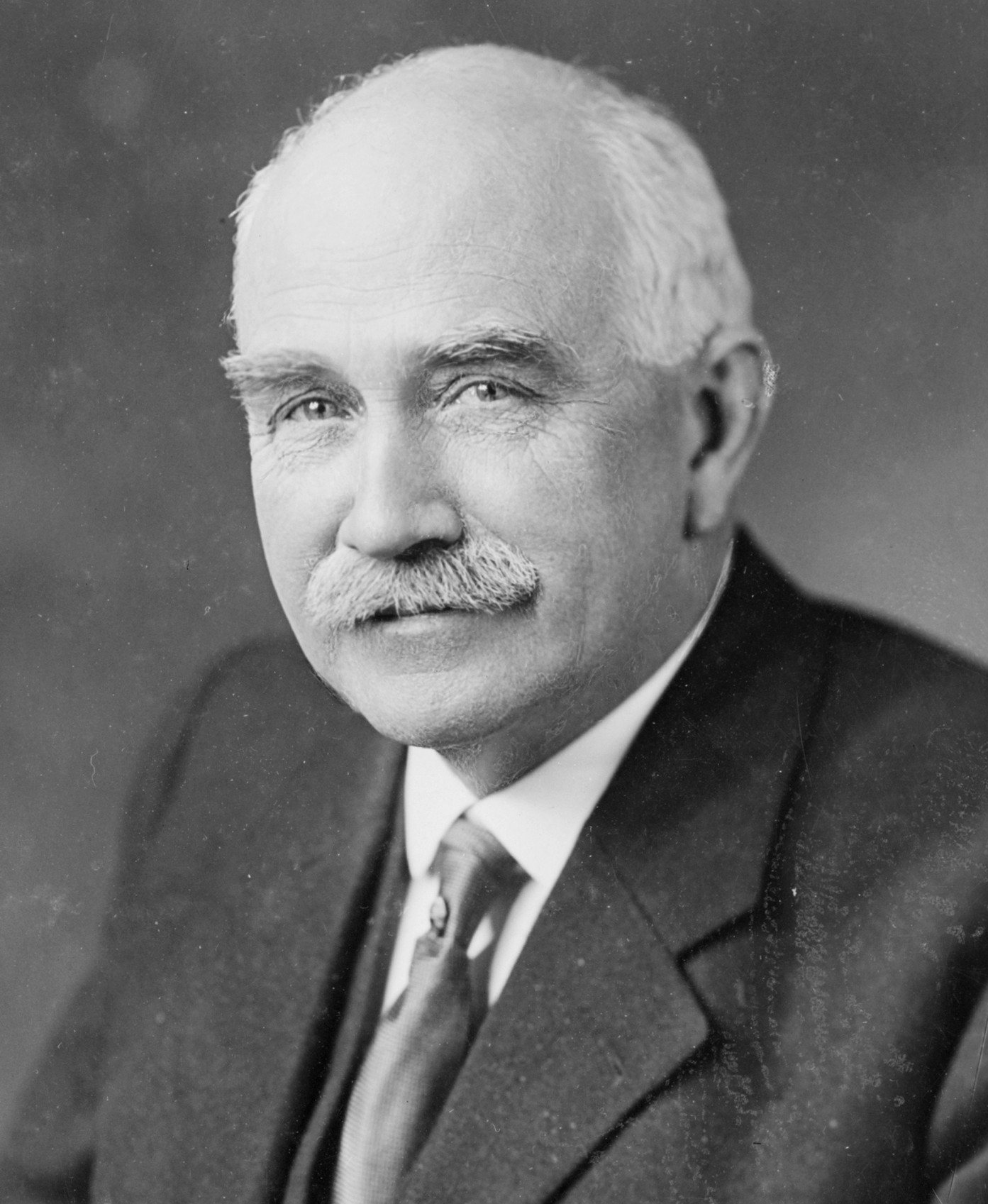
Candidate	Champ Clark	Woodrow Wilson	Judson Harmon
Home state	Missouri	New Jersey	Ohio
Delegate count	14	0	2
Popular vote	21,027	14,289	12,454
Percentage	42.88%	29.14%	25.40%
County results
Clark
30–40%
40–50%
50–60%
60–70%
70–80%
80–90%
Wilson
30–40%
40–50%
50–60%
Harmon
30–40%
40–50%
60–70%

A primary for the Democratic presidential candidate was held in Nebraska on April 19, 1912. Clark and Wilson were endorsed by William Jennings Bryan as they were progressive candidates. Clark won the popular vote and five of the six congressional districts, and therefore 14 of the delegates. Harmon won a single district, gaining two delegates. Wilson failed to win the at-large or any district votes.

1912 Nebraska Democratic presidential primary
Candidate	Votes	%
Champ Clark	21,027	42.88
Woodrow Wilson	14,289	29.14
Judson Harmon	12,454	25.40
R. G. Ross	1,271	2.59
Total votes	49,041	100

=== People's Independent Party ===
A primary for the People's Independent presidential candidate was held in Nebraska on April 19, 1912.

1912 Nebraska People's Independent presidential primary
Candidate	Votes	%
Woodrow Wilson	30	100.00
Total votes	30	100.00

=== Prohibition Party ===
A primary for the Prohibition presidential candidate was held in Nebraska on April 19, 1912.

1912 Nebraska Prohibition presidential primary
Candidate	Votes	%
Eugene W. Chafin	525	100.00
Total votes	525	100.00

=== Republican Party ===
1912 Nebraska Republican presidential primary
- April 19, 1912
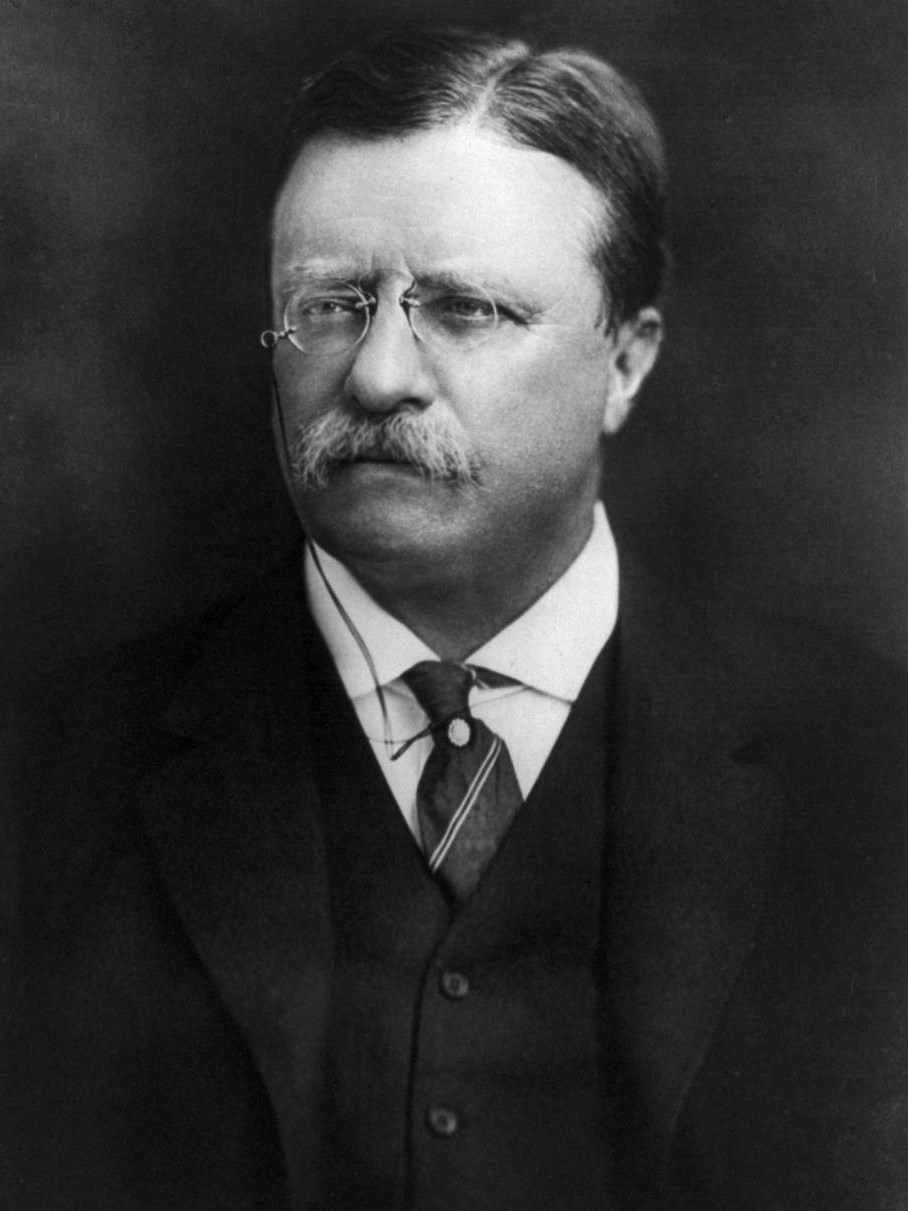

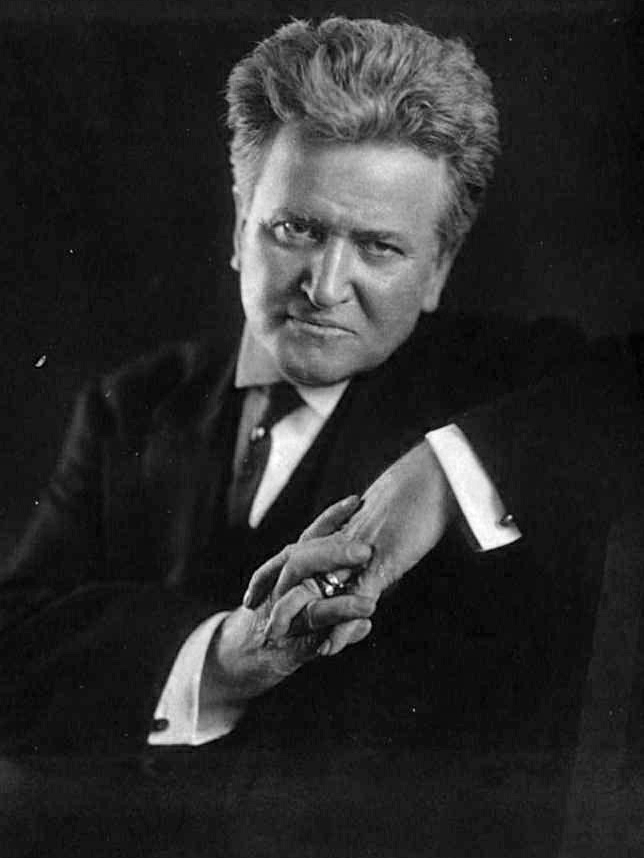

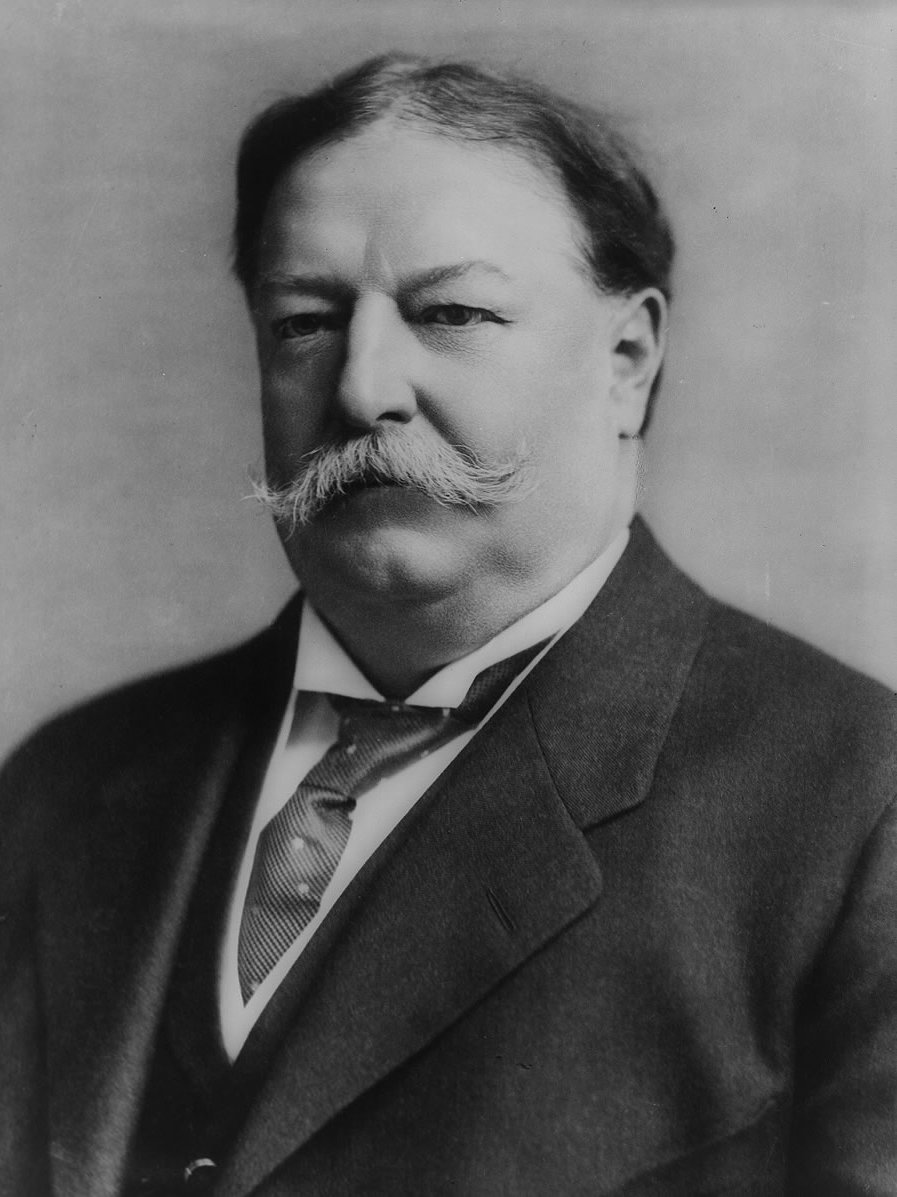
Candidate	Theodore Roosevelt	Robert La Follette	William Howard Taft
Home state	New York	Wisconsin	Ohio
Delegate count	16	0	0
Popular vote	46,795	16,785	13,341
Percentage	60.36%	21.65%	17.21%
County results
Roosevelt:
40–50%
50–60%
60–70%
70–80%

A primary for the Republican presidential candidate was held in Nebraska on April 19, 1912. Roosevelt won the popular vote and all six of the congressional districts, and therefore all 16 delegates.

1912 Nebraska Republican presidential primary
Candidate	Votes	%
Theodore Roosevelt	46,795	60.36
Robert M. La Follette	16,785	21.65
William H. Taft (incumbent)	13,341	17.21
R. G. Ross	605	0.78
Total votes	77,526	100

=== Socialist Party ===
A primary for the Socialist presidential candidate was held in Nebraska on April 19, 1912.

1912 Nebraska Socialist presidential primary
Candidate	Votes	%
Eugene V. Debs	439	100.00
Total votes	439	100.00

== Results ==
1912 United States presidential election in Nebraska
Party	Candidate	Votes	%
Democratic	Woodrow Wilson	109,008	43.69%
Progressive	Theodore Roosevelt	72,681	29.13%
Republican	William Howard Taft (incumbent)	54,226	21.74%
Socialist	Eugene V. Debs	10,185	4.08%
Prohibition	Eugene Chafin	3,383	1.36%
Total votes		243,483	100%

=== Results by county ===
County	Thomas Woodrow Wilson Democratic		William Howard Taft Republican		Theodore Roosevelt Progressive "Bull Moose"		Eugene Victor Debs Socialist		Eugene Wilder Chafin Prohibition		Margin (Note: Because Wilson finished first and Roosevelt second in Nebraska as a whole, all margins given is Wilson vote minus Roosevelt vote and percentage margins Wilson percentage minus Roosevelt percentage unless otherwise stated for the county in question.)		Total votes cast
County	#	%	#	%	#	%	#	%	#	%	#	%	Total votes cast
Adams	2,117	50.79%	796	19.10%	943	22.62%	188	4.51%	124	2.98%	1,174	28.17%	4,168
Antelope	1,238	39.39%	877	27.90%	946	30.10%	50	1.59%	32	1.02%	292	9.29%	3,143
Banner	56	20.51%	53	19.41%	128	46.89%	34	12.45%	2	0.73%	-72	-26.37%	273
Blaine	163	37.56%	126	29.03%	107	24.65%	32	7.37%	6	1.38%	37 (Note: In this county where Taft did run second ahead of Roosevelt, margin given is Wilson vote minus Taft vote and percentage margin Wilson percentage minus Taft percentage.)	8.53%	434
Boone	1,360	46.05%	570	19.30%	939	31.80%	48	1.63%	36	1.22%	421	14.26%	2,953
Box Butte	518	40.34%	227	17.68%	423	32.94%	97	7.55%	19	1.48%	95	7.40%	1,284
Boyd	651	39.15%	281	16.90%	651	39.15%	57	3.43%	23	1.38%	0	0.00%	1,663
Brown	483	37.07%	295	22.64%	413	31.70%	91	6.98%	21	1.61%	70	5.37%	1,303
Buffalo	2,061	43.72%	1,081	22.93%	1,256	26.64%	259	5.49%	57	1.21%	805	17.08%	4,714
Burt	1,040	35.03%	865	29.13%	1,003	33.78%	41	1.38%	20	0.67%	37	1.25%	2,969
Butler	1,756	54.21%	823	25.41%	585	18.06%	38	1.17%	37	1.14%	933	28.81%	3,239
Cass	2,009	46.41%	970	22.41%	1,132	26.15%	152	3.51%	66	1.52%	877	20.26%	4,329
Cedar	1,511	45.87%	716	21.74%	1,044	31.69%	8	0.24%	15	0.46%	467	14.18%	3,294
Chase	262	33.42%	197	25.13%	264	33.67%	38	4.85%	23	2.93%	-2	-0.26%	784
Cherry	1,047	39.93%	679	25.90%	630	24.03%	230	8.77%	36	1.37%	368	14.04%	2,622
Cheyenne	348	36.25%	233	24.27%	281	29.27%	78	8.13%	20	2.08%	67	6.98%	960
Clay	1,694	46.31%	557	15.23%	1,292	35.32%	52	1.42%	63	1.72%	402	10.99%	3,658
Colfax	998	47.52%	620	29.52%	392	18.67%	79	3.76%	11	0.52%	378	18.00%	2,100
Cuming	1,484	53.83%	759	27.53%	476	17.27%	30	1.09%	8	0.29%	725	26.30%	2,757
Custer	2,395	41.46%	1,051	18.20%	1,898	32.86%	353	6.11%	79	1.37%	497	8.60%	5,776
Dakota	612	42.80%	408	28.53%	350	24.48%	49	3.43%	11	0.77%	204	14.27%	1,430
Dawes	583	37.11%	298	18.97%	610	38.83%	65	4.14%	15	0.95%	-27	-1.72%	1,571
Dawson	1,613	47.48%	449	13.22%	1,207	35.53%	74	2.18%	54	1.59%	406	11.95%	3,397
Deuel	135	35.34%	64	16.75%	157	41.10%	25	6.54%	1	0.26%	-22	-5.76%	382
Dixon	823	33.99%	582	24.04%	955	39.45%	23	0.95%	38	1.57%	-132	-5.45%	2,421
Dodge	1,987	43.81%	1,330	29.33%	935	20.62%	209	4.61%	74	1.63%	657	14.49%	4,535
Douglas	12,908	44.08%	6,185	21.12%	7,911	27.02%	2,154	7.36%	124	0.42%	4,997	17.07%	29,282
Dundy	304	34.55%	148	16.82%	347	39.43%	71	8.07%	10	1.14%	-43	-4.89%	880
Fillmore	1,736	48.02%	972	26.89%	787	21.77%	77	2.13%	43	1.19%	764	21.13%	3,615
Franklin	1,148	48.91%	332	14.15%	779	33.19%	58	2.47%	30	1.28%	369	15.72%	2,347
Frontier	657	38.97%	293	17.38%	579	34.34%	120	7.12%	37	2.19%	78	4.63%	1,686
Furnas	1,266	49.32%	354	13.79%	809	31.52%	83	3.23%	55	2.14%	457	17.80%	2,567
Gage	2,593	40.85%	1,336	21.05%	2,159	34.01%	173	2.73%	87	1.37%	434	6.84%	6,348
Garden	282	33.06%	136	15.94%	369	43.26%	48	5.63%	18	2.11%	-87	-10.20%	853
Garfield	234	28.85%	192	23.67%	245	30.21%	135	16.65%	5	0.62%	-11	-1.36%	811
Gosper	524	54.58%	129	13.44%	283	29.48%	9	0.94%	15	1.56%	241	25.10%	960
Grant	93	39.41%	82	34.75%	52	22.03%	7	2.97%	2	0.85%	11	4.66%	236
Greeley	913	52.29%	371	21.25%	376	21.53%	65	3.72%	21	1.20%	537	30.76%	1,746
Hall	2,085	47.26%	1,047	23.73%	973	22.05%	249	5.64%	58	1.31%	1,038	23.53%	4,412
Hamilton	1,433	46.41%	450	14.57%	1,055	34.16%	87	2.82%	63	2.04%	378	12.24%	3,088
Harlan	918	44.58%	325	15.78%	611	29.67%	141	6.85%	64	3.11%	307	14.91%	2,059
Hayes	189	31.98%	106	17.94%	247	41.79%	41	6.94%	8	1.35%	-58	-9.81%	591
Hitchcock	471	44.56%	128	12.11%	370	35.00%	60	5.68%	28	2.65%	101	9.56%	1,057
Holt	1,456	40.47%	778	21.62%	1,193	33.16%	129	3.59%	42	1.17%	263	7.31%	3,598
Hooker	121	40.20%	103	34.22%	57	18.94%	19	6.31%	1	0.33%	18	5.98%	301
Howard	1,118	50.77%	431	19.57%	542	24.61%	87	3.95%	24	1.09%	576	26.16%	2,202
Jefferson	1,396	39.60%	655	18.58%	1,205	34.18%	226	6.41%	43	1.22%	191	5.42%	3,525
Johnson	890	39.43%	672	29.77%	649	28.75%	26	1.15%	20	0.89%	218	9.66%	2,257
Kearney	1,012	48.65%	336	16.15%	657	31.59%	42	2.02%	33	1.59%	355	17.07%	2,080
Keith	304	37.25%	188	23.04%	234	28.68%	85	10.42%	5	0.61%	70	8.58%	816
Keya Paha	221	27.39%	259	32.09%	246	30.48%	70	8.67%	11	1.36%	13 (Note: In this county where Wilson ran third behind both Taft and Roosevelt, margin given is Taft vote minus Roosevelt vote and percentage margin Taft percentage minus Roosevelt percentage.)	1.61%	807
Kimball	109	26.65%	73	17.85%	206	50.37%	18	4.40%	3	0.73%	-97	-23.72%	409
Knox	1,803	46.61%	1,028	26.58%	930	24.04%	81	2.09%	26	0.67%	775	20.04%	3,868
Lancaster	6,708	47.47%	2,566	18.16%	4,143	29.32%	446	3.16%	268	1.90%	2,565	18.15%	14,131
Lincoln	1,129	35.39%	690	21.63%	911	28.56%	400	12.54%	60	1.88%	218	6.83%	3,190
Logan	153	39.95%	97	25.33%	110	28.72%	17	4.44%	6	1.57%	43	11.23%	383
Loup	113	24.67%	131	28.60%	148	32.31%	59	12.88%	7	1.53%	-17	-3.71%	458
Madison	1,718	42.87%	1,181	29.47%	1,015	25.33%	56	1.40%	37	0.92%	537	13.40%	4,007
McPherson	180	31.20%	114	19.76%	231	40.03%	45	7.80%	7	1.21%	-51	-8.84%	577
Merrick	950	40.93%	526	22.66%	694	29.90%	40	1.72%	111	4.78%	256	11.03%	2,321
Morrill	391	34.97%	227	20.30%	400	35.78%	75	6.71%	25	2.24%	-9	-0.81%	1,118
Nance	716	37.16%	630	32.69%	534	27.71%	20	1.04%	27	1.40%	86	4.46%	1,927
Nemaha	1,374	46.00%	672	22.50%	842	28.19%	55	1.84%	44	1.47%	532	17.81%	2,987
Nuckolls	1,312	43.49%	738	24.46%	851	28.21%	78	2.59%	38	1.26%	461	15.28%	3,017
Otoe	1,945	48.14%	922	22.82%	1,053	26.06%	70	1.73%	50	1.24%	892	22.08%	4,040
Pawnee	958	40.49%	593	25.06%	711	30.05%	53	2.24%	51	2.16%	247	10.44%	2,366
Perkins	253	43.70%	101	17.44%	190	32.82%	32	5.53%	3	0.52%	63	10.88%	579
Phelps	972	40.42%	254	10.56%	1,071	44.53%	76	3.16%	32	1.33%	-99	-4.12%	2,405
Pierce	948	44.42%	694	32.52%	461	21.60%	15	0.70%	16	0.75%	254	11.90%	2,134
Platte	2,015	51.93%	589	15.18%	1,200	30.93%	45	1.16%	31	0.80%	815	21.01%	3,880
Polk	996	39.90%	485	19.43%	784	31.41%	89	3.57%	142	5.69%	212	8.49%	2,496
Red Willow	923	42.40%	256	11.76%	782	35.92%	190	8.73%	26	1.19%	141	6.48%	2,177
Richardson	1,977	44.45%	965	21.70%	1,350	30.35%	104	2.34%	52	1.17%	627	14.10%	4,448
Rock	279	32.11%	230	26.47%	289	33.26%	56	6.44%	15	1.73%	-10	-1.15%	869
Saline	1,942	48.73%	1,185	29.74%	731	18.34%	58	1.46%	69	1.73%	757	19.00%	3,985
Sarpy	857	47.80%	404	22.53%	439	24.48%	70	3.90%	23	1.28%	418	23.31%	1,793
Saunders	2,080	45.23%	864	18.79%	1,508	32.79%	89	1.94%	58	1.26%	572	12.44%	4,599
Scotts Bluff	495	28.66%	314	18.18%	657	38.04%	230	13.32%	31	1.80%	-162	-9.38%	1,727
Seward	1,573	46.48%	788	23.29%	966	28.55%	30	0.89%	27	0.80%	607	17.94%	3,384
Sheridan	630	37.70%	377	22.56%	512	30.64%	122	7.30%	30	1.80%	118	7.06%	1,671
Sherman	673	36.16%	455	24.45%	592	31.81%	123	6.61%	18	0.97%	81	4.35%	1,861
Sioux	375	37.84%	150	15.14%	395	39.86%	63	6.36%	8	0.81%	-20	-2.02%	991
Stanton	724	47.88%	471	31.15%	297	19.64%	15	0.99%	5	0.33%	253	16.73%	1,512
Thayer	1,490	45.29%	703	21.37%	963	29.27%	85	2.58%	49	1.49%	527	16.02%	3,290
Thomas	172	44.56%	86	22.28%	103	26.68%	22	5.70%	3	0.78%	69	17.88%	386
Thurston	834	45.38%	437	23.78%	492	26.77%	63	3.43%	12	0.65%	342	18.61%	1,838
Valley	788	38.16%	552	26.73%	561	27.17%	121	5.86%	43	2.08%	227	10.99%	2,065
Washington	1,180	42.23%	599	21.44%	906	32.43%	91	3.26%	18	0.64%	274	9.81%	2,794
Wayne	808	37.44%	600	27.80%	722	33.46%	19	0.88%	9	0.42%	86	3.99%	2,158
Webster	1,168	42.26%	532	19.25%	915	33.10%	79	2.86%	70	2.53%	253	9.15%	2,764
Wheeler	194	40.17%	70	14.49%	179	37.06%	37	7.66%	3	0.62%	15	3.11%	483
York	1,886	45.88%	962	23.40%	1,085	26.39%	86	2.09%	92	2.24%	801	19.48%	4,111
Totals	109,008	43.69%	54,226	21.74%	72,681	29.13%	10,185	4.08%	3,383	1.36%	36,327	14.56%	249,483

== See also ==
- United States presidential elections in Nebraska
