= 1908 Ohio gubernatorial election =

- November 3, 1908
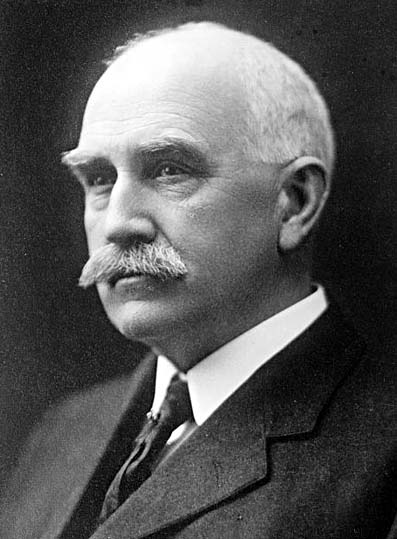

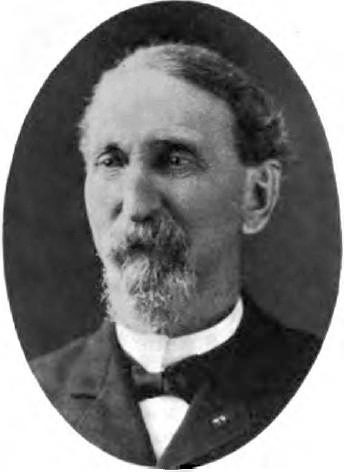
Nominee	Judson Harmon	Andrew L. Harris
Party	Democratic	Republican
Popular vote	552,569	533,197
Percentage	49.20%	47.47%
- County results Harmon: 40–50% 50–60% 60–70% Harris: 40–50% 50–60% 60–70% 70–80%
Governor before election
Andrew L. Harris
Republican
Elected Governor
Judson Harmon
Democratic

The 1908 Ohio gubernatorial election was held on November 3, 1908. Democratic nominee Judson Harmon defeated incumbent Republican Andrew L. Harris with 49.20% of the vote.

== General election ==
=== Candidates ===
Major party candidates

- Judson Harmon, Democratic
- Andrew L. Harris, Republican

Other candidates

- Robert Bandlow, Socialist
- John Kircher, Socialist Labor
- John B. Martin, Prohibition
- Andrew F. Otte, Independent

=== Results ===
1908 Ohio gubernatorial election
Party	Candidate	Votes	%	±%
Democratic	Judson Harmon	552,569	49.20%	
Republican	Andrew L. Harris (incumbent)	533,197	47.47%	
Socialist	Robert Bandlow	28,573	2.54%	
Socialist Labor	John Kircher	7,665	0.68%	
Prohibition	John B. Martin	797	0.07%	
Independent	Andrew F. Otte	397	0.04%	
Majority		19,372		
Turnout				
Democratic gain from Republican		Swing		
