= John M. Pattison =

43rd Governor of Ohio

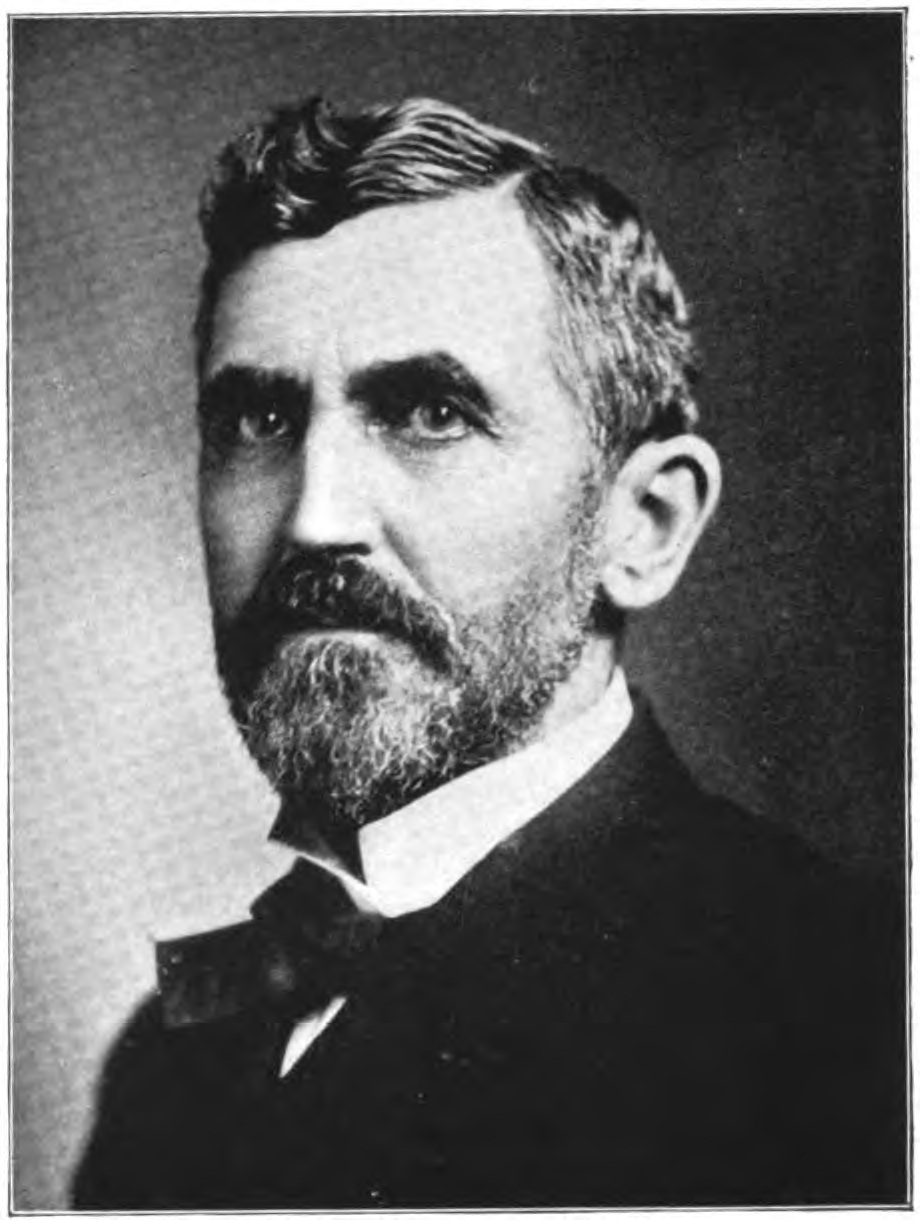

43rd Governor of Ohio
- In office January 8, 1906 – June 18, 1906
- Lieutenant: Andrew L. Harris
- Preceded by: Myron T. Herrick
- Succeeded by: Andrew L. Harris

Member of the U.S. House of Representatives from Ohio's 11th district
- In office March 4, 1891 – March 3, 1893
- Preceded by: Albert C. Thompson
- Succeeded by: Charles H. Grosvenor

Member of the Ohio House of Representatives from the Hamilton County district
- In office January 5, 1874 – January 2, 1876

Member of the Ohio Senate from the 4th district
- In office February 1890 – March 3, 1891
- Preceded by: Thomas Q. Ashburn
- Succeeded by: Joseph J. McMaken

Personal details
- Born: June 13, 1847 Owensville, Ohio, U.S.
- Died: June 18, 1906 (aged 59) Milford, Ohio, U.S.
- Resting place: Greenlawn Cemetery, Milford
- Party: Democratic
- Spouse(s): Aletheia Williams; Anna Williams
- Children: 4
- Education: Ohio Wesleyan University; Cincinnati Law School

John M. Pattison (June 13, 1847 – June 18, 1906) was an American Democratic politician from Ohio. Pattison was for five months the 43rd governor of Ohio, serving for a shorter period than any other person elected to the office before his death.

== Biography ==
Pattison was born near Owensville, Ohio. He joined the Union Army during the American Civil War in 1864. After the war ended, Pattison attended Ohio Wesleyan University, graduating in 1869. He graduated from Cincinnati Law School in 1872, and was admitted to the bar in 1872. Pattison briefly served in the Ohio House of Representatives in 1873 before working as an executive at an insurance company. Pattison was elected to the United States House of Representatives in 1890 after briefly serving in the Ohio State Senate. He served one term from 1891 to 1893 but lost an 1892 bid for re-election. Pattison was elected governor in 1905. He entered office in January 1906 and served until his death in June.

Pattison attended his inauguration but returned home ill that day. He never again returned to the executive office. Pattison directed the government from his bed until he died at his home Promont, near Milford, Ohio. His cause of death was Bright's disease.

He is buried in Greenlawn Cemetery in Milford, Ohio.

Pattison was married twice. He married Aletheia Williams, who died leaving three children. Another daughter had died. His second wife was Anna Williams, sister of his first wife.

Pattison was a thirty-second degree Scottish Rite Mason.

In 2004, Pattison Elementary School was built in Milford as John Pattison's namesake. The school educates students in kindergarten through sixth grade. Pattison Park, located on US Highway 50 west of Owensville, is also named in his honor.

== Gallery ==
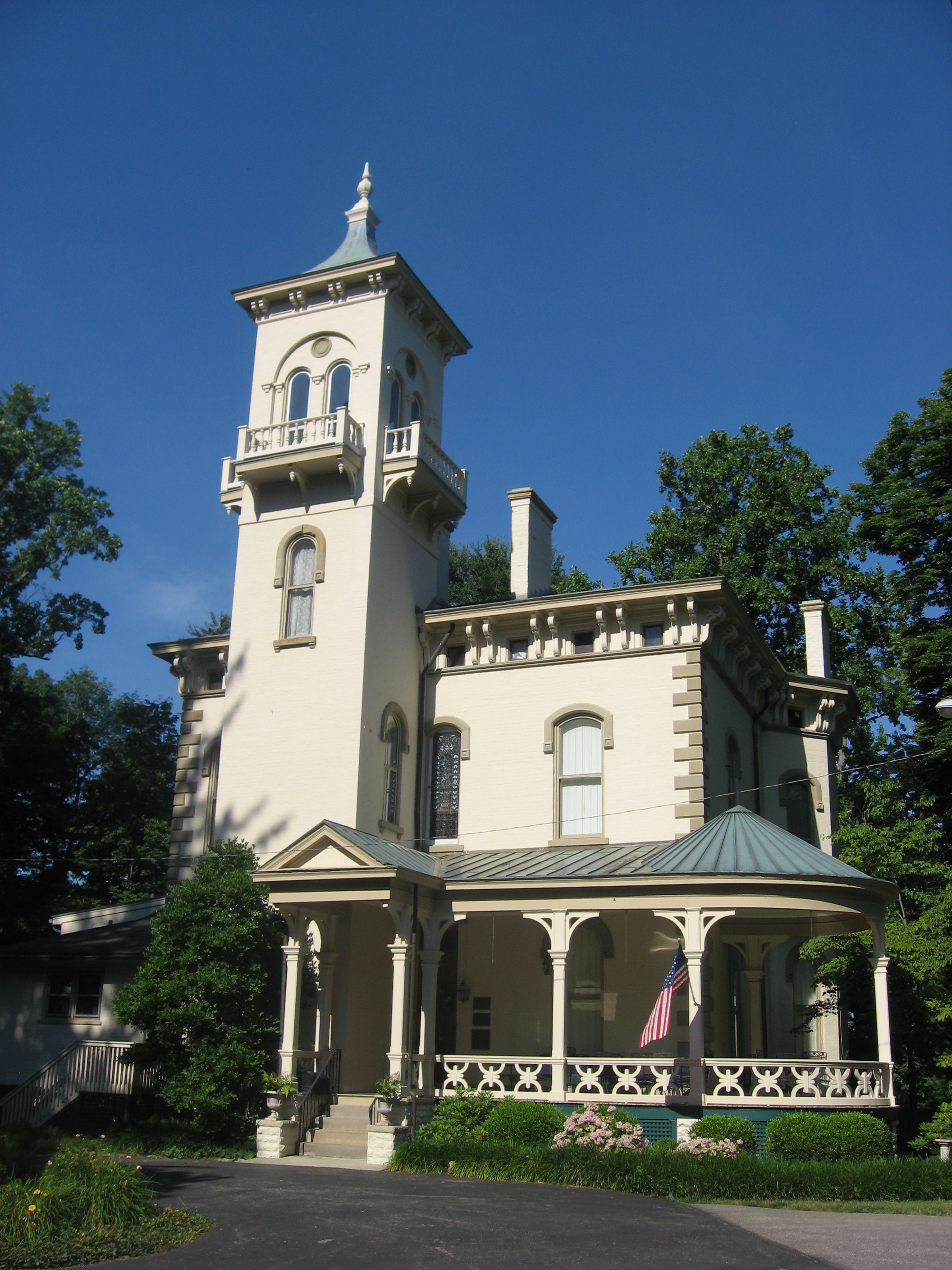
Promont, Pattison's Milford home

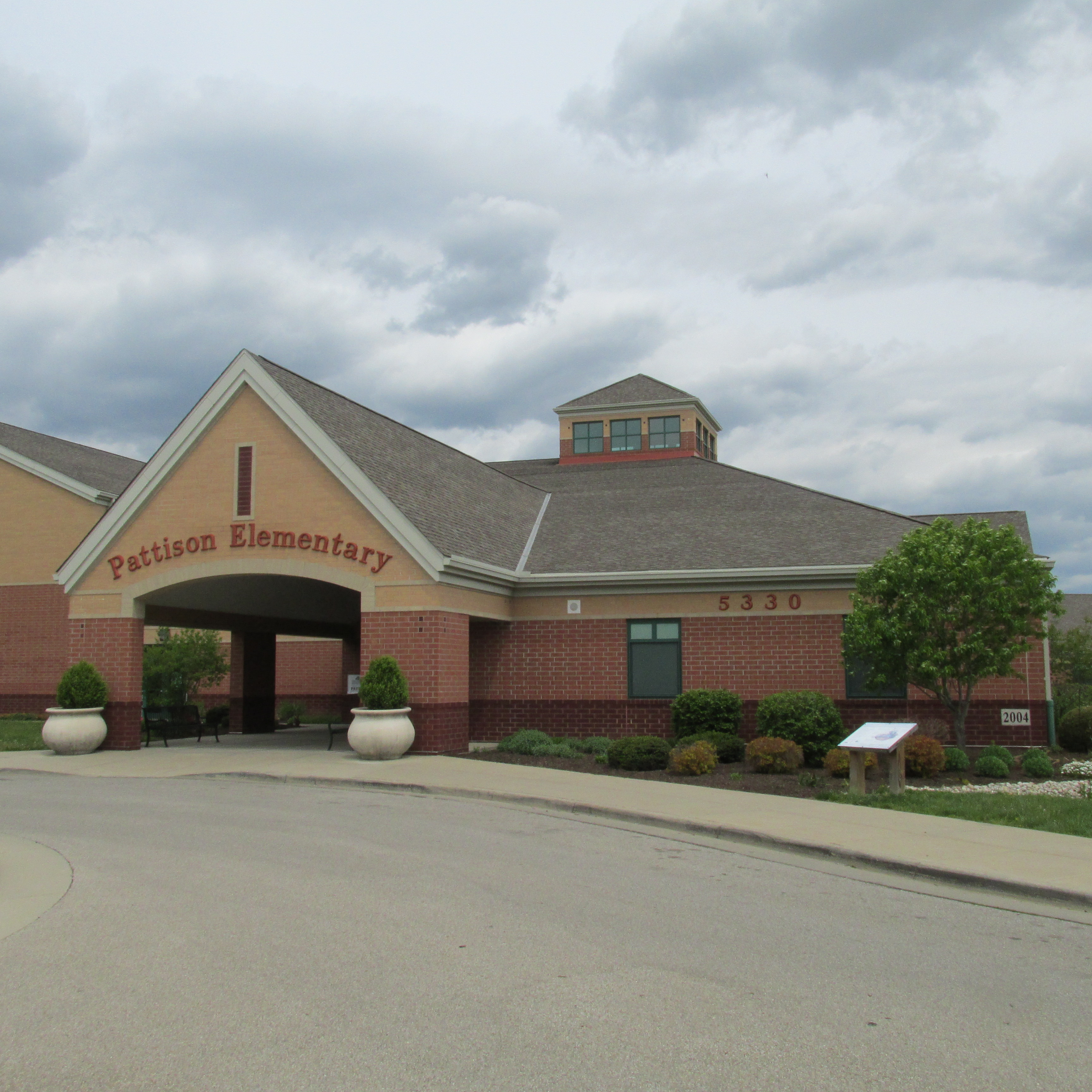
Pattison Elementary School

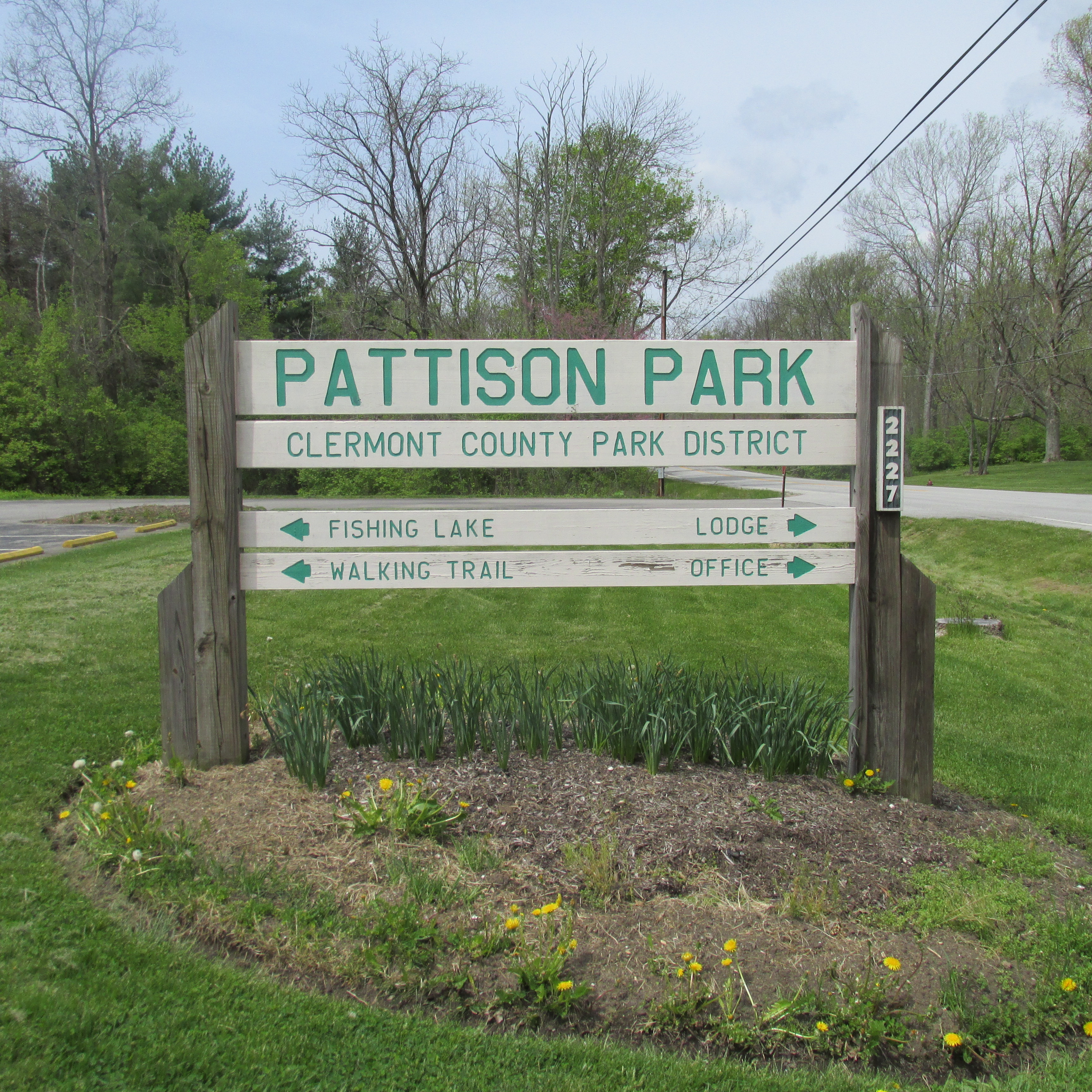
Pattison Park

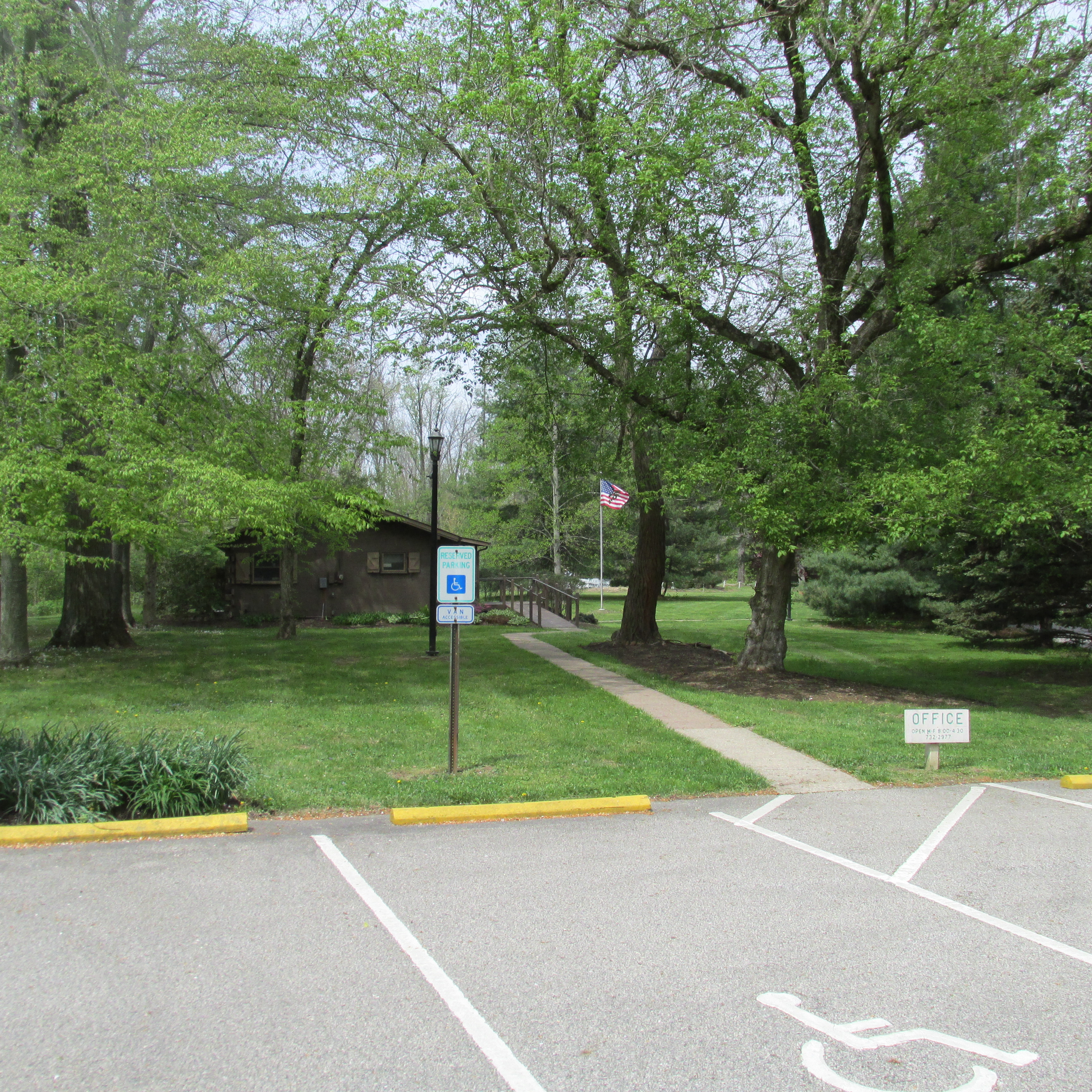
Pattison Park

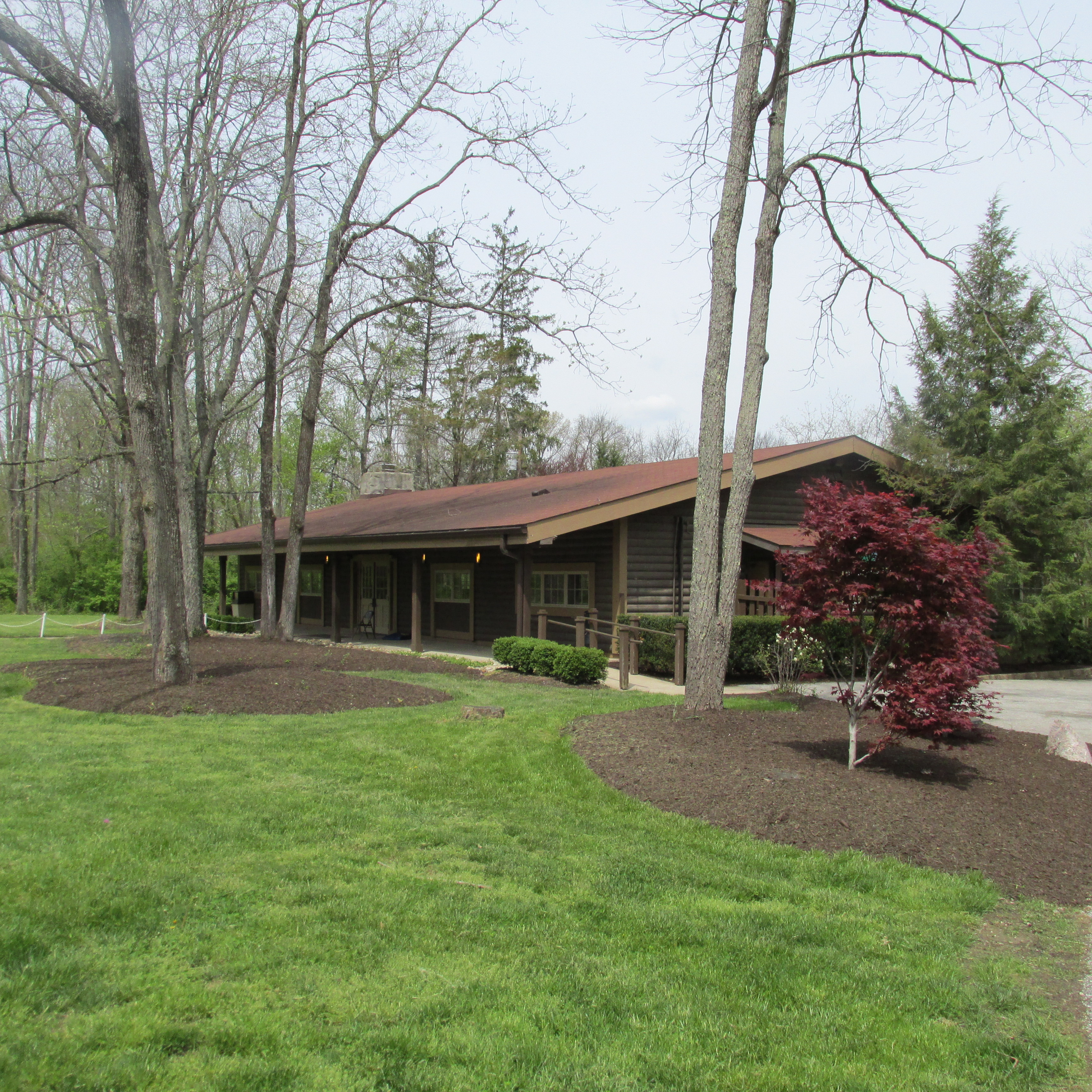
Pattison Park

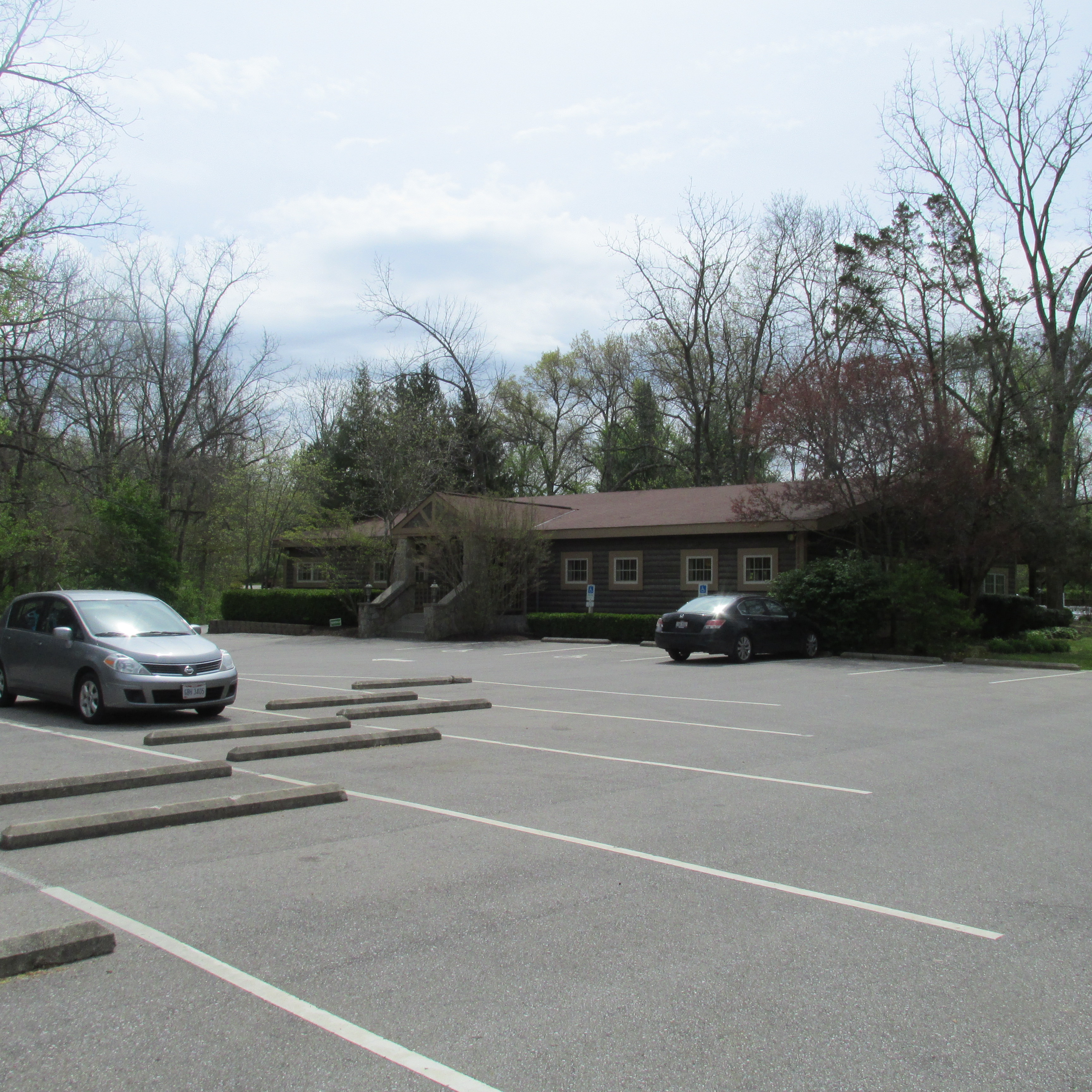
Pattison Park

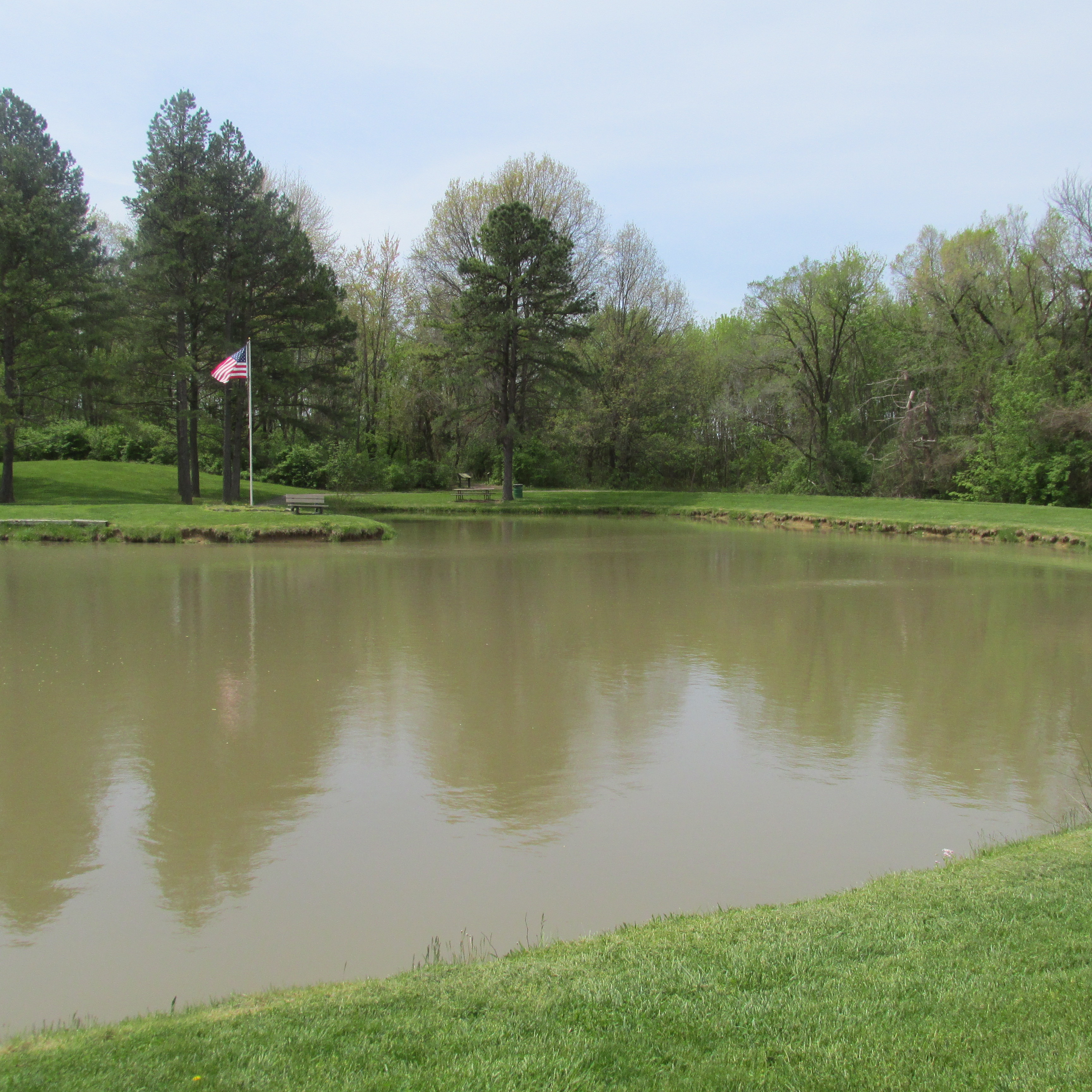
Pattison Park

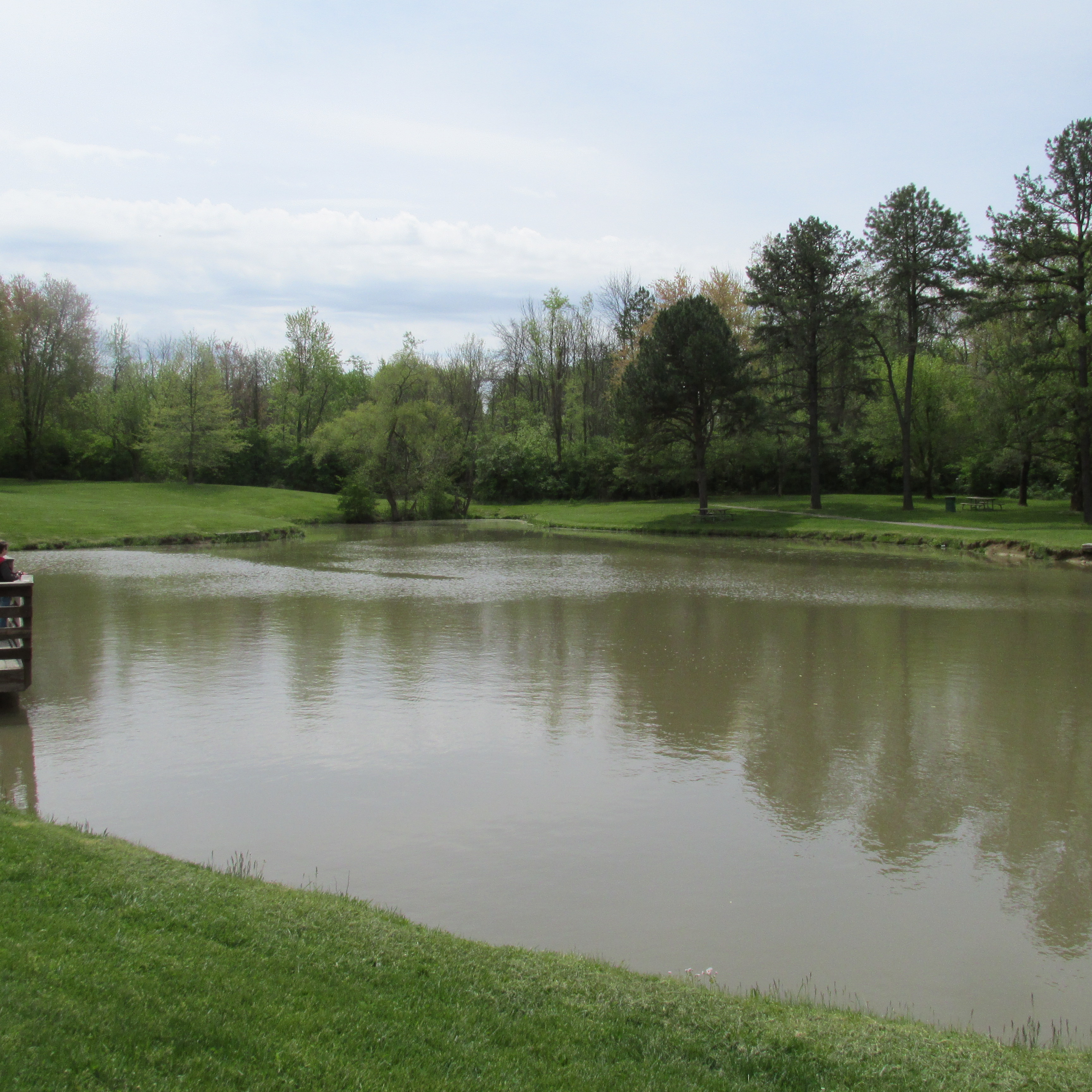
Pattison Park

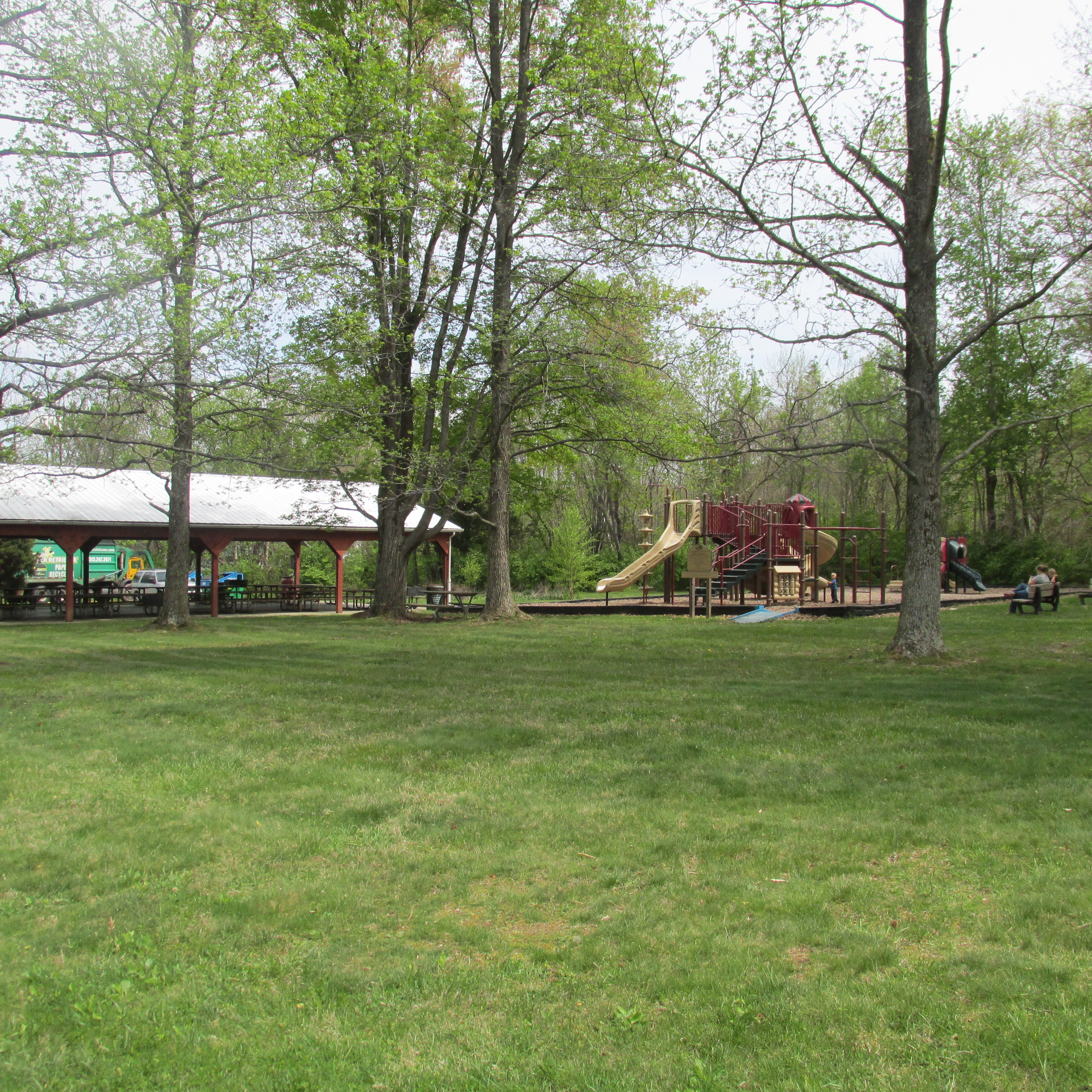
Pattison Park

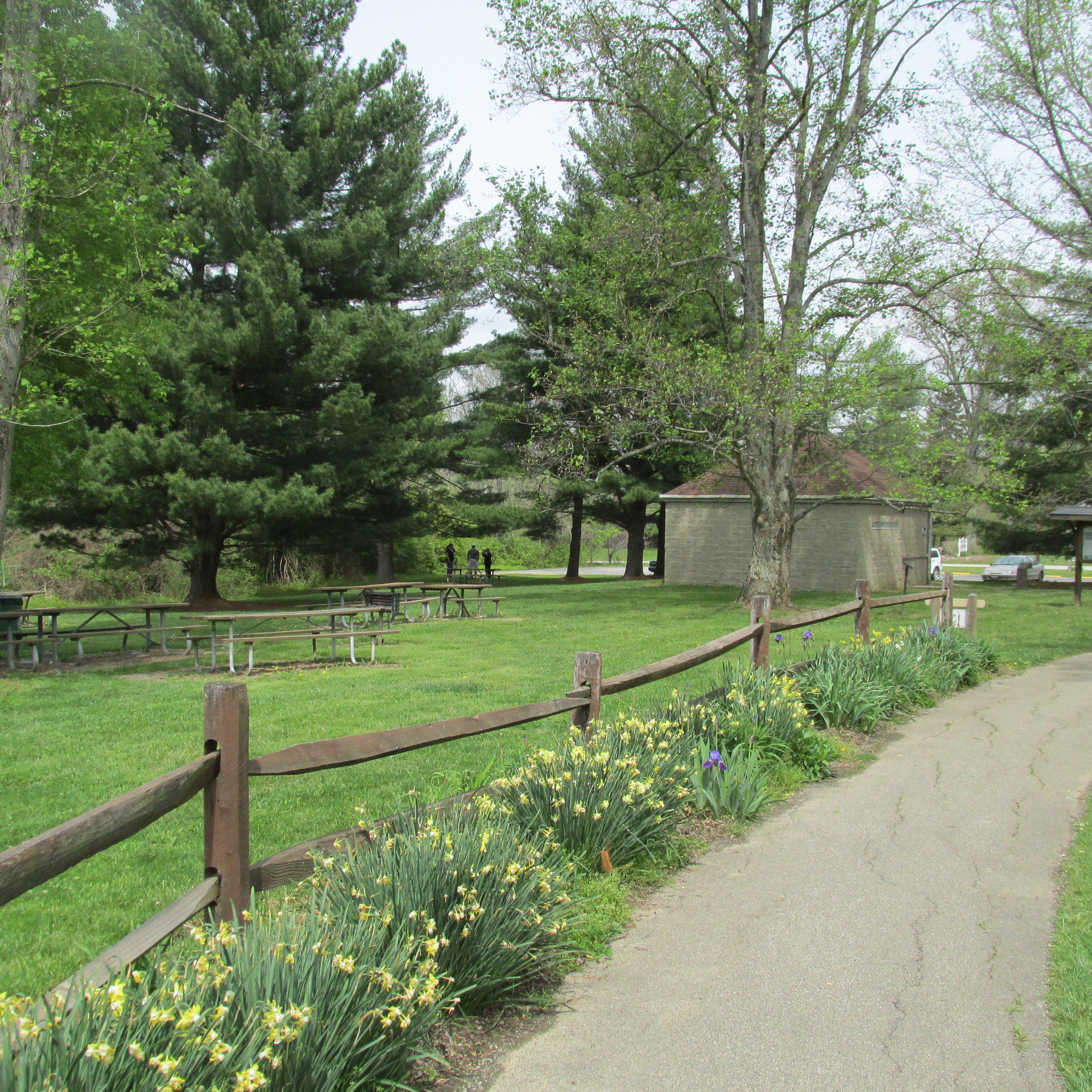
Pattison Park

== External sources ==
- United States Congress. "John M. Pattison (id: P000135)". Biographical Directory of the United States Congress. Retrieved on 2008-11-05
- "Promont House Museum". Greater Milford Area Historical Society. Archived from the original on January 15, 2012.
- John M. Pattison at Find a Grave

U.S. House of Representatives
Preceded by Albert C. Thompson	Member of the U.S. House of Representatives from Ohio's 11th congressional district March 4, 1891 – March 3, 1893	Succeeded by Charles H. Grosvenor
Political offices
Preceded by Myron T. Herrick	Governor of Ohio; 1906	Succeeded by Andrew L. Harris
Party political offices
Preceded by Tom L. Johnson	Democratic Party nominee for Governor of Ohio; 1905	Succeeded by Judson Harmon
