= Mabja Zangbo =

River in Tibet

Mabja Zangbo Majia Zangbu, Kongque He, ma jia cang bu Mabza Zhangbo
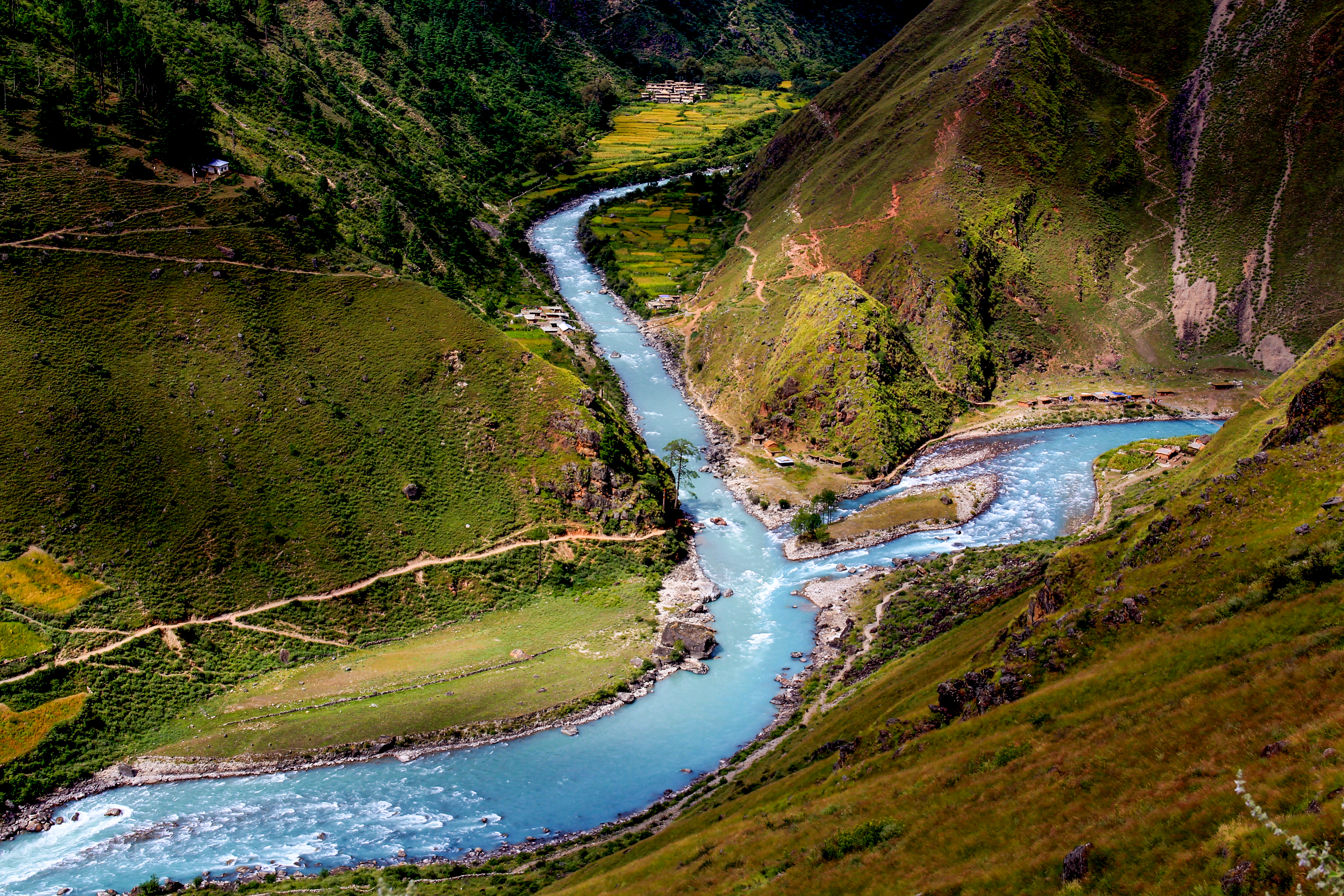
- Nickname: Peacock River

Location
- Latitude: 30°14'47"
- Longitude: 82°10'2"
- Place: Tibet’s Burang County
- Elevation: 5726 metres above sea level

Physical characteristics
- Source: near Manasarovar Lake

Mabja Zangbo or Mabja Tsangpo is a river in Tibet Autonomous Region, China. The upper portion of the Karnali River is called Mabja Zangbo river in China. It further joins River Ghaghara (Karnali) in Nepal and eventually flows into Ganges River (Ganga) in India. It passes through the tri-junction on Nepal's border with India and China.

Mabja Zangbo River in Tibet

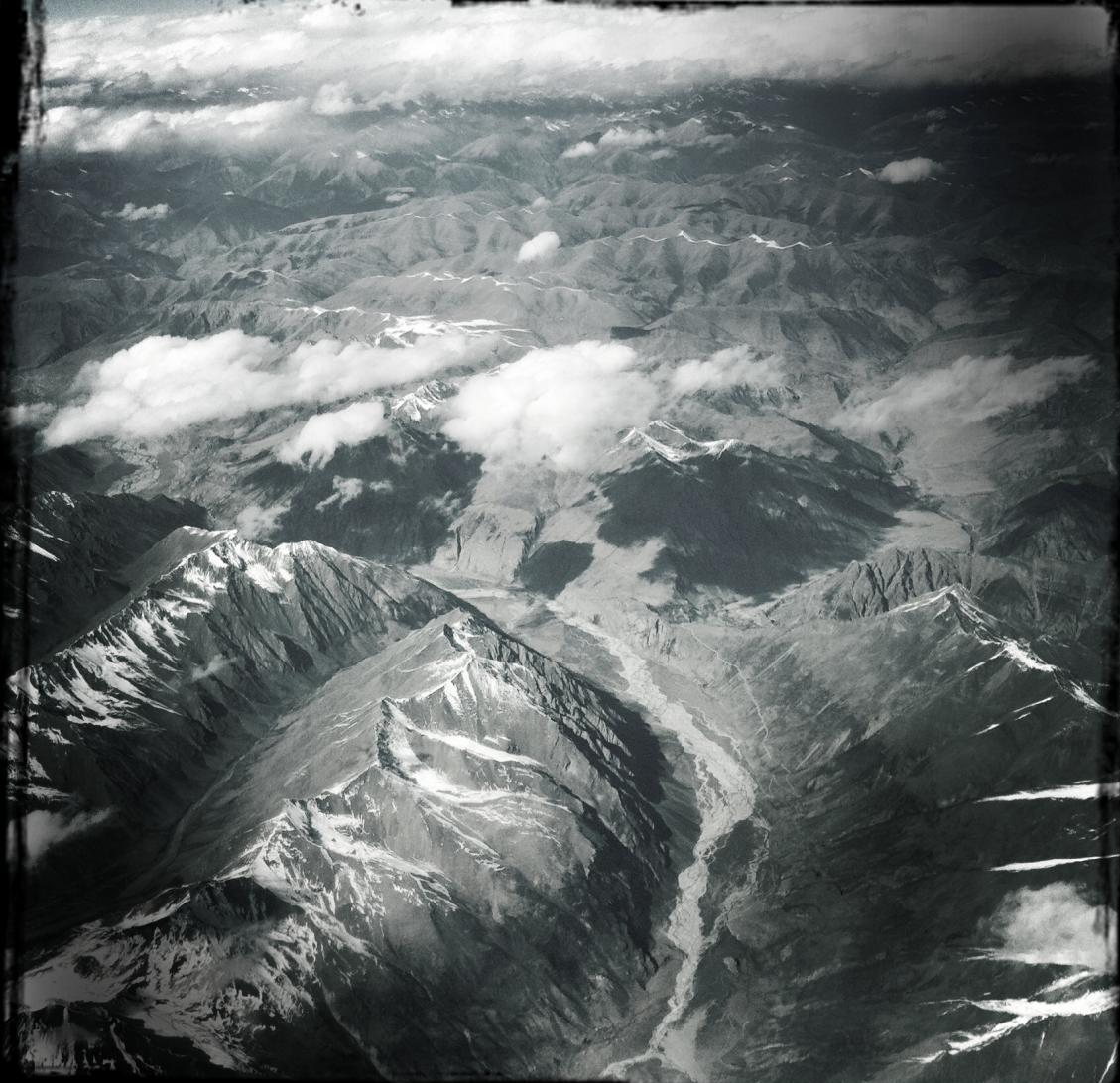
Aerial photographs of Tibet with Mabja Zangbo river in October 1980, Tibet & Nepal

In January 2023, reports emerged with satellite imagery of China constructing a dam since May 2021 at around 16 km north of this tri-junction which lies opposite to the Kalapani territory of Uttarakhand. This is similar to the activities at the Yarlung Zangbo (Brahmaputra) river near Arunachal Pradesh, meant to be aimed at using water as leverage since China is an upper riparian state. China adheres to the Harmon Doctrine and dams near the international border may aid in the geopolitics of claiming the disputed area. Due to its extreme nature, this theory of Absolute Territory Sovereignty is rejected by international customary laws.

== See also ==
- Manasarovar Lake
