= Francis W. Treadway =

American politician (1869–1925)

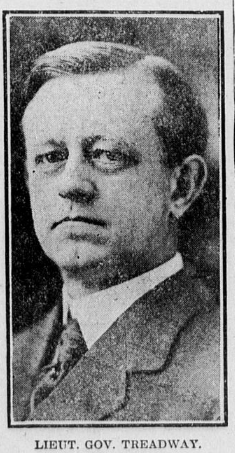
- circa 1910

Lieutenant Governor of Ohio
- In office 1909–1911
- Governor: Judson Harmon

Member of the Ohio General Assembly for Cuyahoga
- In office 1904–1905

Personal details
- Born: January 7, 1869 New Haven, Connecticut
- Died: December 24, 1925 (aged 56)
- Party: Republican
- Education: Yale Law School; Worcester Polytechnic
- Occupation: Lawyer

Francis Wilcox Treadway (January 7, 1869 – December 24, 1925) was an American politician who served as the 30th lieutenant governor of Ohio from 1909 to 1911.

== Biography ==
Francis W. Treadway was born in New Haven, Connecticut in 1869, and was moved to Cleveland, Ohio when ten years of age. He was educated at Cleveland grammar and high schools. He graduated with BS from Worcester Polytechnic Institute in 1890, and Yale Law School in 1892. In 1893, he and William H. Marlatt formed the law firm of Treadway and Marlatt. He married Esther Sutliff Frisbie on January 5, 1897, and they had two children. He wrote Ohio Mechanics Lien Law, 1901. He was United States Commissioner for Northern District of Ohio, 1902–1903.

== Career ==
Treadway was elected to represent Cuyahoga County in the Ohio House of Representatives in 1903 for the 76th General Assembly, (1904–1905), as a Republican. In 1908, Treadway was elected lieutenant governor.

Political offices
Preceded by Andrew L. Harris	Lieutenant Governor of Ohio; 1909–1911	Succeeded by Atlee Pomerene
