= Promont =

Historic house in Ohio, United States

- U.S. National Register of Historic Places
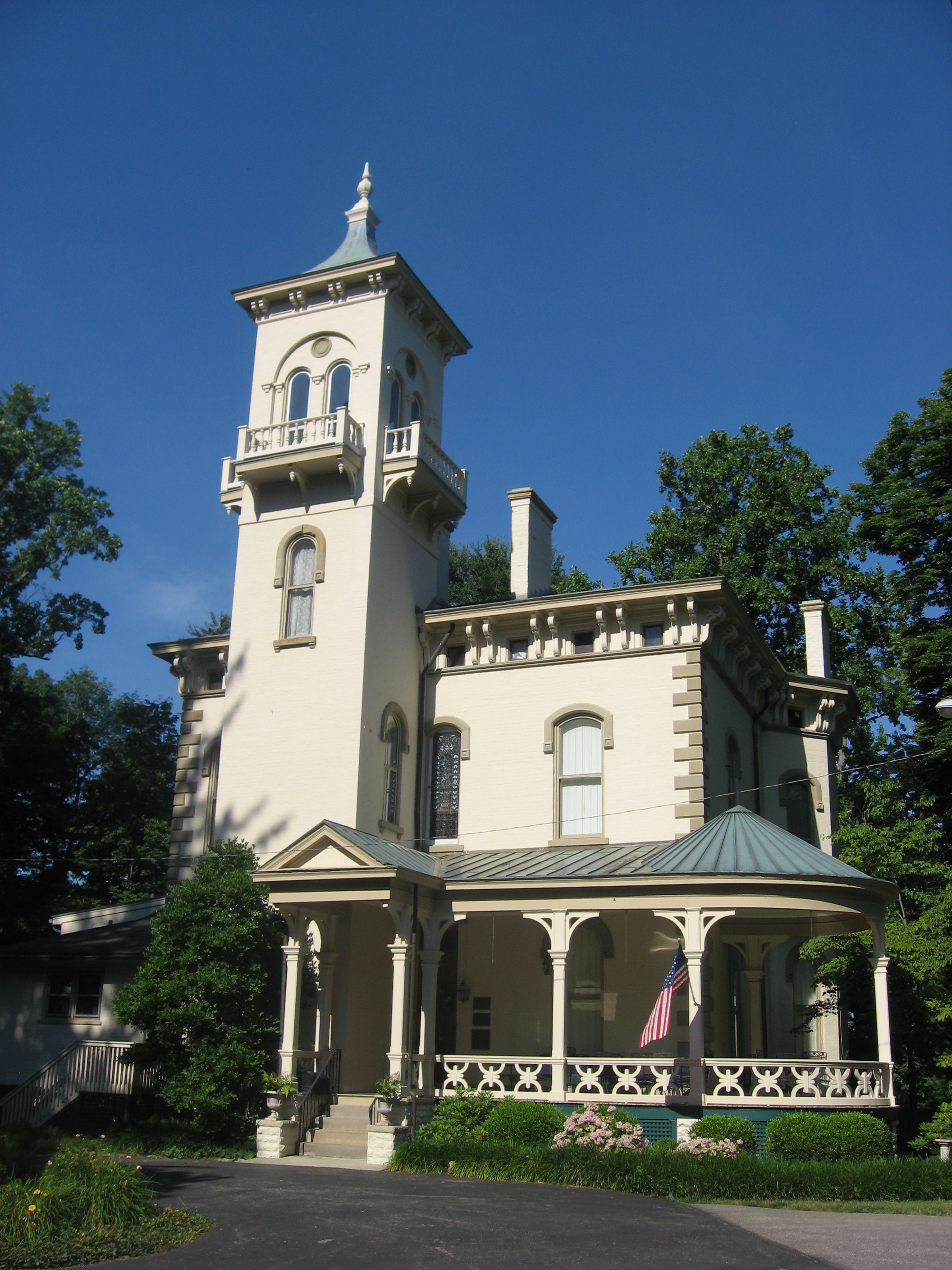
- Promont

- Location within Ohio Location within the United States
- Interactive map showing the location of Promont
- Nearest city: Milford, OH
- Coordinates: 39°10′39″N 84°16′45″W
- NRHP reference No.: 80002959
- Added to NRHP: November 21, 1980

Promont is a historic house in Milford, Ohio, United States, which was built in 1865 and listed on the National Register of Historic Places in 1980. It was home to John M. Pattison, 43rd Governor of Ohio from 1879 until his death in 1906.

== History ==
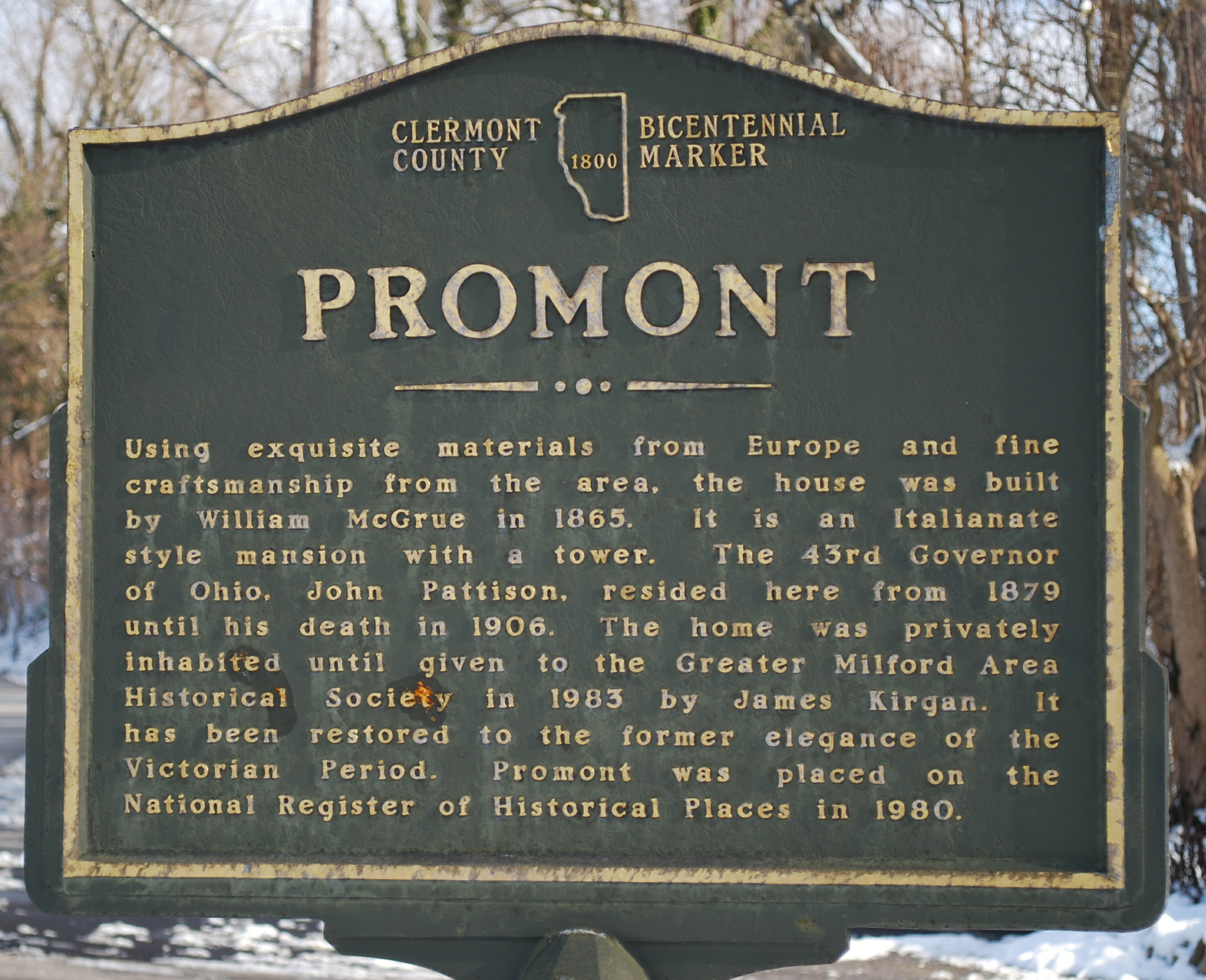
Promont Historic Marker

Promont was built in 1865 by William McGrue on a hill above the village of Milford, OH and the Little Miami River. The Italianate Victorian home was purchased in 1879 by John M. Pattison, 43rd Governor of Ohio.

Promont served as the Governor's residence during Pattison's term in office. Pattison suffered from Bright's disease and was so weakened by the disease that after his inauguration on January 8, 1906, he was too ill to remain in the state capital. He returned home to Promont that day. He never returned to Columbus. Pattison directed the state government from Promont until his death on June 18, 1906.

Promont remained a private residence until 1983 when it was donated by James Kirgan to the Greater Milford Area Historical Society. Promont was placed on the National Register of Historic Places on November 21, 1980.

== Promont Today ==
Today, Promont operates as a historic house museum. The home is furnished in Victorian style and is open to the public for tours. It also houses exhibits of local history and a historical library of local reference information.
