= Andrew L. Harris =

44th Governor of Ohio

Andrew Lintner Harris
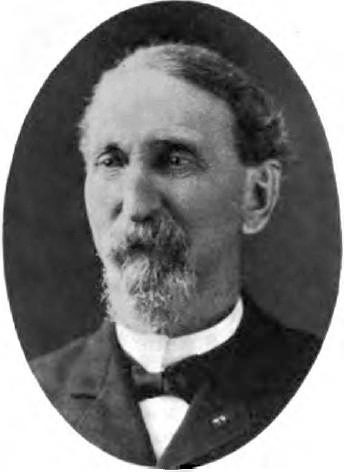

44th Governor of Ohio
- In office June 18, 1906 – January 11, 1909
- Preceded by: John M. Pattison
- Succeeded by: Judson Harmon

23rd and 29th Lieutenant Governor of Ohio
- In office January 8, 1906 – June 18, 1906
- Governor: John M. Pattison
- Preceded by: Warren G. Harding
- Succeeded by: Francis W. Treadway
- In office January 11, 1892 – January 13, 1896
- Governor: William McKinley
- Preceded by: William V. Marquis
- Succeeded by: Asa W. Jones

Member of the Ohio Senate from the 3rd district
- In office January 1, 1866 – January 5, 1868
- Preceded by: Lewis B. Gunckel
- Succeeded by: Jonathan Kenney

Personal details
- Born: November 17, 1835 Milford Township, Ohio, U.S.
- Died: September 13, 1915 (aged 79) Eaton, Ohio, U.S.
- Resting place: Mound Hill Cemetery, Eaton, Ohio
- Party: Republican
- Spouse: Caroline Conger
- Children: 1

Military service
- Allegiance: United States of America; Union
- Branch/service: United States Army; Union Army
- Rank: Colonel; Bvt. Brigadier General
- Commands: 75th Ohio Infantry Regiment
- Battles/wars: American Civil War

Andrew Lintner Harris (also known as The Farmer–Statesman) (November 17, 1835 – September 13, 1915) was one of the heroes of the Battle of Gettysburg during the American Civil War and served as the 44th governor of Ohio.

== Biography ==
Harris was born in Milford Township, Butler County, Ohio, and was educated in the local schools. After graduating from Miami University in 1860, Harris enlisted as a private in the Union Army. Harris was married at West Florence, Ohio, to Caroline Conger of Preble County, Ohio, on October 17, 1865. They had one son.

== Career ==
He quickly rose to the rank of colonel of the 75th Ohio Infantry, seeing action in many of the Army of the Potomac's engagements. At Gettysburg on July 1, 1863, he led his men in a successful withdrawal through the hotly contested streets to Cemetery Hill, where they entrenched on the northeastern slope. Assuming command of a brigade, Harris played a key role in delaying repeated attacks the next day by Harry T. Hays's famed Louisiana Tigers, helping secure the critical hill for George G. Meade. Harris continued to lead troops through the war, although he suffered an embarrassing defeat in August 1864 at the Battle of Gainesville in Florida. When the war ended he was brevetted a brigadier general of volunteers.

An attorney, Harris began practicing law in 1865 and then served in the Ohio State Senate from 1866 to 1870 and as Preble County Probate Judge from 1875 to 1882. Harris served as the 23rd and 29th lieutenant governor of Ohio having been elected in 1891 and 1893 as the running mate of William McKinley, and again in 1905 when Democrat John M. Pattison was elected governor. An early temperance activist and Republican politician, Harris succeeded Pattison (upon the latter's death in June 1906) as governor, serving from 1906 to 1909. He was nominated in 1908 but lost narrowly to Judson Harmon in the gubernatorial election. While in office, Harris signed legislation banning corporate political donations. Harris also served on the U.S. Industrial Commission on Trusts under President McKinley. His official residence was at the Hartman Hotel in Downtown Columbus.

== Honors ==
Per state law, U.S. 127 between Hamilton and Eaton was renamed the Gov. Andrew L. Harris Bicentennial Roadway. At the Milford Township Bicentennial in 2005, the Gov. Andrew L. Harris Bicentennial Roadway was dedicated by the Governor's relative, James Brodbelt Harris, president of the family reunion association, and whose family continues to own an Ohio Century Farm in the township.

== Death ==
Harris died of heart trouble on September 13, 1915, and is interred in Mound Hill Union Cemetery in Eaton, Ohio.

Political offices
Preceded by William V. Marquis	Lieutenant Governor of Ohio; 1892–1896	Succeeded by Asa W. Jones
Preceded by Warren G. Harding	Lieutenant Governor of Ohio; 1906	Succeeded by Francis W. Treadway
Preceded by John M. Pattison	Governor of Ohio; 1906–1909	Succeeded by Judson Harmon
Party political offices
Preceded by Myron T. Herrick	Republican Party nominee for Governor of Ohio; 1908	Succeeded by Warren G. Harding
