= 1905 Ohio gubernatorial election =

- November 7, 1905
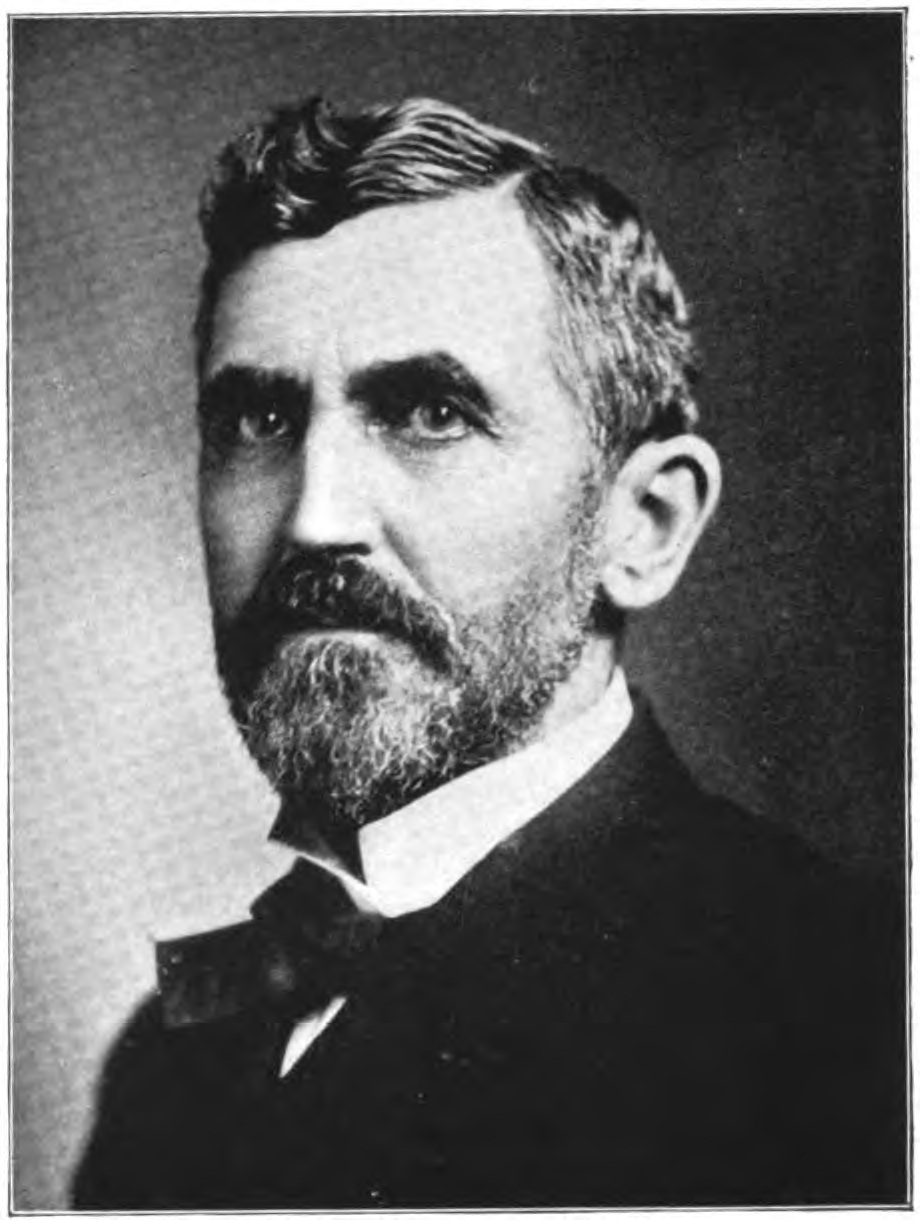

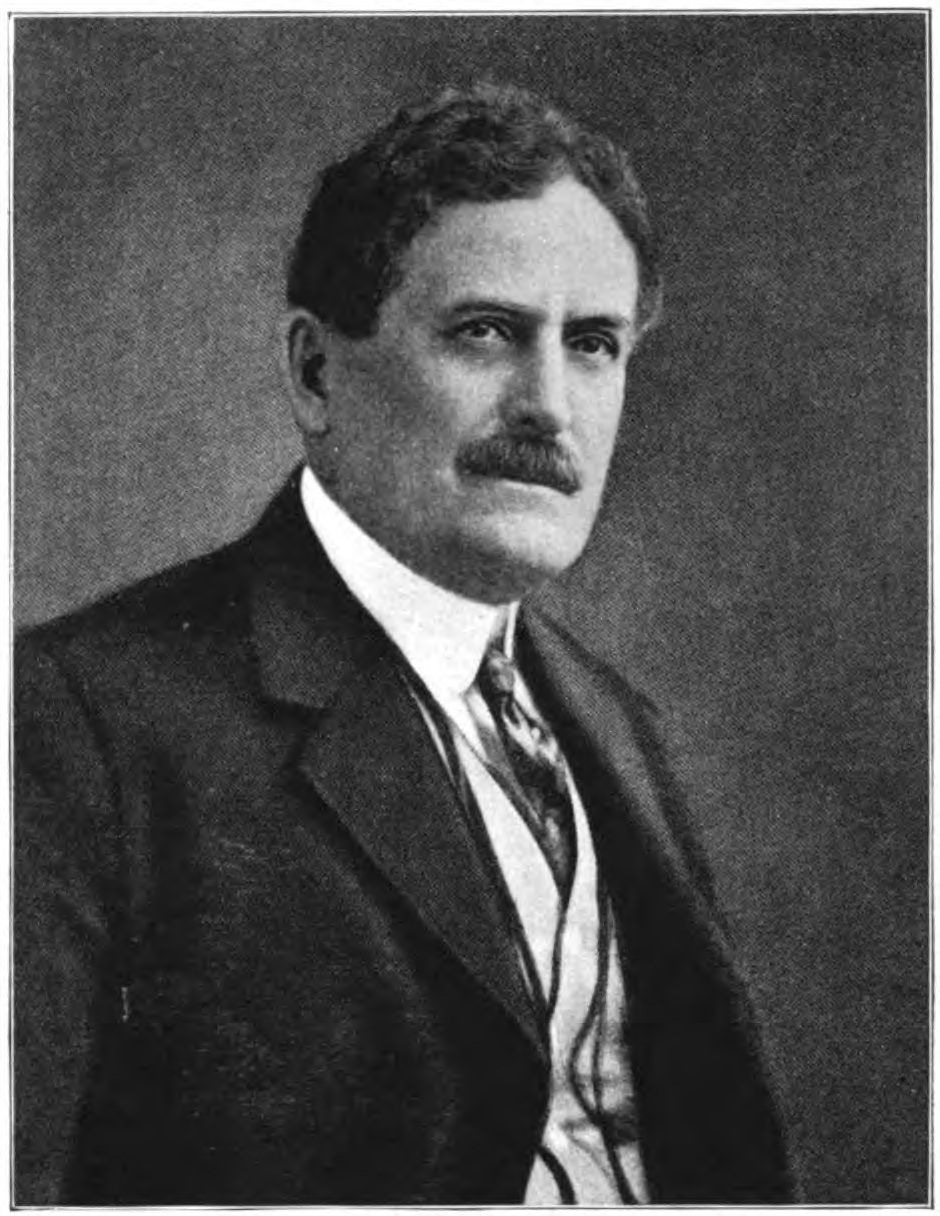
Nominee	John M. Pattison	Myron T. Herrick
Party	Democratic	Republican
Popular vote	473,264	430,617
Percentage	50.53%	45.98%
- County results Pattison: 40–50% 50–60% 60–70% Herrick: 40–50% 50–60%
Governor before election
Myron T. Herrick
Republican
Elected Governor
John M. Pattison
Democratic

The 1905 Ohio gubernatorial election was held on November 7, 1905. Democratic nominee John M. Pattison defeated incumbent Republican Myron T. Herrick with 50.53% of the vote.

== General election ==
=== Candidates ===
Major party candidates

- John M. Pattison, Democratic
- Myron T. Herrick, Republican

Other candidates

- Isaac Cowan, Socialist
- Aaron S. Watkins, Prohibition
- John E. Seitger, Socialist Labor

=== Results ===
1905 Ohio gubernatorial election
Party	Candidate	Votes	%	±%
Democratic	John M. Pattison	473,264	50.53%	
Republican	Myron T. Herrick (incumbent)	430,617	45.98%	
Socialist	Isaac Cowan	17,795	1.90%	
Prohibition	Aaron S. Watkins	13,061	1.40%	
Socialist Labor	John E. Seitger	1,808	0.19%	
Majority		42,647		
Turnout				
Democratic gain from Republican		Swing		
