= Harmon Doctrine =

Doctrine

The Harmon Doctrine, or the doctrine of absolute territorial sovereignty, holds that a country has absolute sovereignty over the territory and resources within its borders.

== Background ==
The doctrine is named after U.S. Attorney General Judson Harmon, who made a comment during the Chamizal dispute, a dispute between USA and Mexico over the Rio Grande in 1895, in reference to international watercourses —

The fact that the Rio Grande lacks sufficient water to permit its use by the inhabitants of both countries does not entitle Mexico to impose restrictions on the USA [...] The fundamental principle of international law is the absolute sovereignty of every nation, as against all others, within its own territory. All exceptions […] to the full and complete power of a nation within its own territories must be traced up to the consent of the nation itself. They can flow from no other legitimate source. [...] [T]he rules, principles, and precedents of international law impose no liability or obligation upon the United States.
