= Judson Harmon =

American politician (1846–1927)

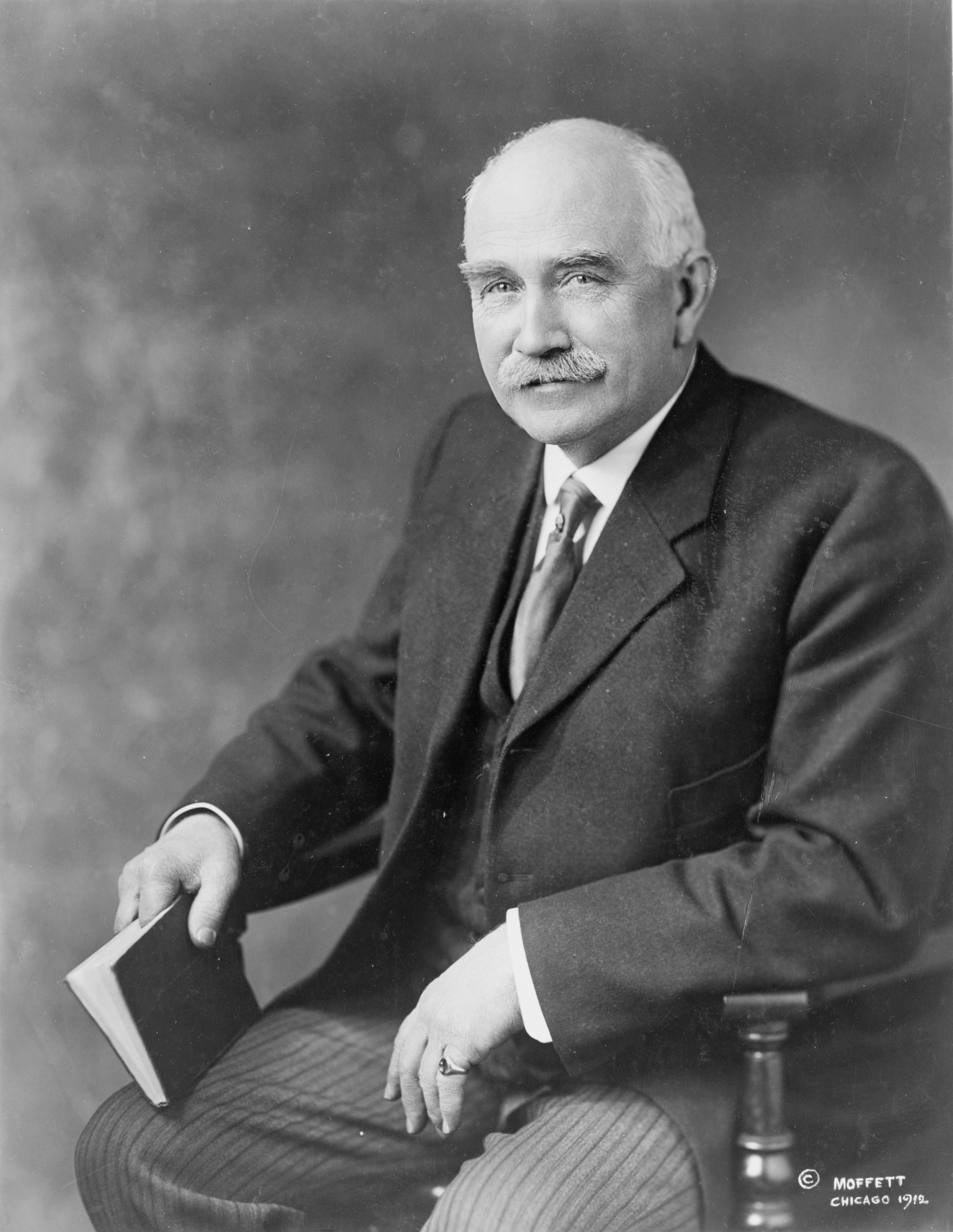
- Harmon, c. 1912

45th Governor of Ohio
- In office January 11, 1909 – January 13, 1913
- Lieutenant: Francis W. Treadway; Atlee Pomerene; Hugh L. Nichols
- Preceded by: Andrew L. Harris
- Succeeded by: James M. Cox

41st United States Attorney General
- In office June 11, 1895 – March 4, 1897
- President: Grover Cleveland
- Preceded by: Richard Olney
- Succeeded by: Joseph McKenna

Judge of the Superior Court of Cincinnati
- In office 1878–1887

Judge of the Common Pleas Court
- In office 1876

Personal details
- Born: February 3, 1846 Newtown, Ohio, U.S.
- Died: February 22, 1927 (aged 81) Cincinnati, Ohio, U.S.
- Party: Democratic
- Spouse: Olivia Scobey (m. 1870; died 1916)
- Children: 3
- Education: Denison University (BA); University of Cincinnati (LLB)
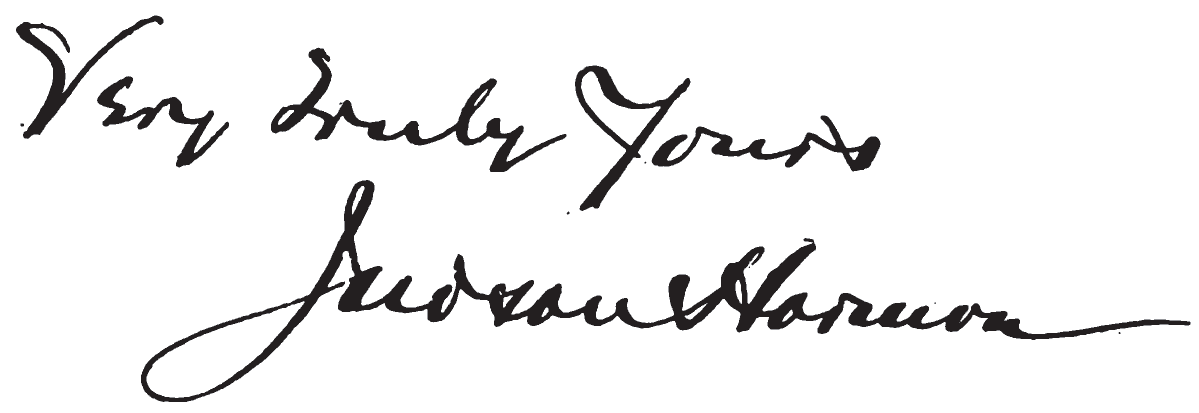
- Signature

Judson Harmon (February 3, 1846 – February 22, 1927) was an American Democratic politician from Ohio. He served as United States Attorney General under President Grover Cleveland and later served as the 45th governor of Ohio.

== Early life ==
Harmon was born in Newtown, Ohio, and named after Adoniram Judson, the famed American Baptist foreign missionary. His parents were Benjamin Franklin Harmon and Julia Brunson, a native of Olean, New York. His ancestors on both sides of his family were English and included men who served in the colonial wars and the American Revolutionary War, including Cornelius Brooks and his father James Brooks.

Judson was a distant relative of Frances Folsom, the wife of President Grover Cleveland, through her mother Emma Harmon.

Harmon graduated from Denison University in 1866. He graduated from the Cincinnati Law School and was admitted to the bar in 1869. Harmon was elected judge of the Common Pleas Court in 1876 but left months later to run unsuccessfully for the State Senate. He was elected judge of the Superior Court of Cincinnati in 1878 and served until he resigned in 1887 to resume the practice of law.

== Attorney General ==
He was appointed Attorney General by President Cleveland on June 8, 1895, upon the elevation of Richard Olney to become United States Secretary of State. Harmon served out the remainder of Cleveland's second term in office. Shortly after his appointment, Harmon urged Congress to fix some of the weaknesses in the Sherman Antitrust Act. Harmon also issued the most explicit statement of what became known as the Harmon doctrine of absolute sovereignty, "the rules, principles and precedents of international law impose no liability or obligation upon the United States" in a case involving a claim by Mexico for damages from diverting the waters of the Rio Grande.

== Governor ==
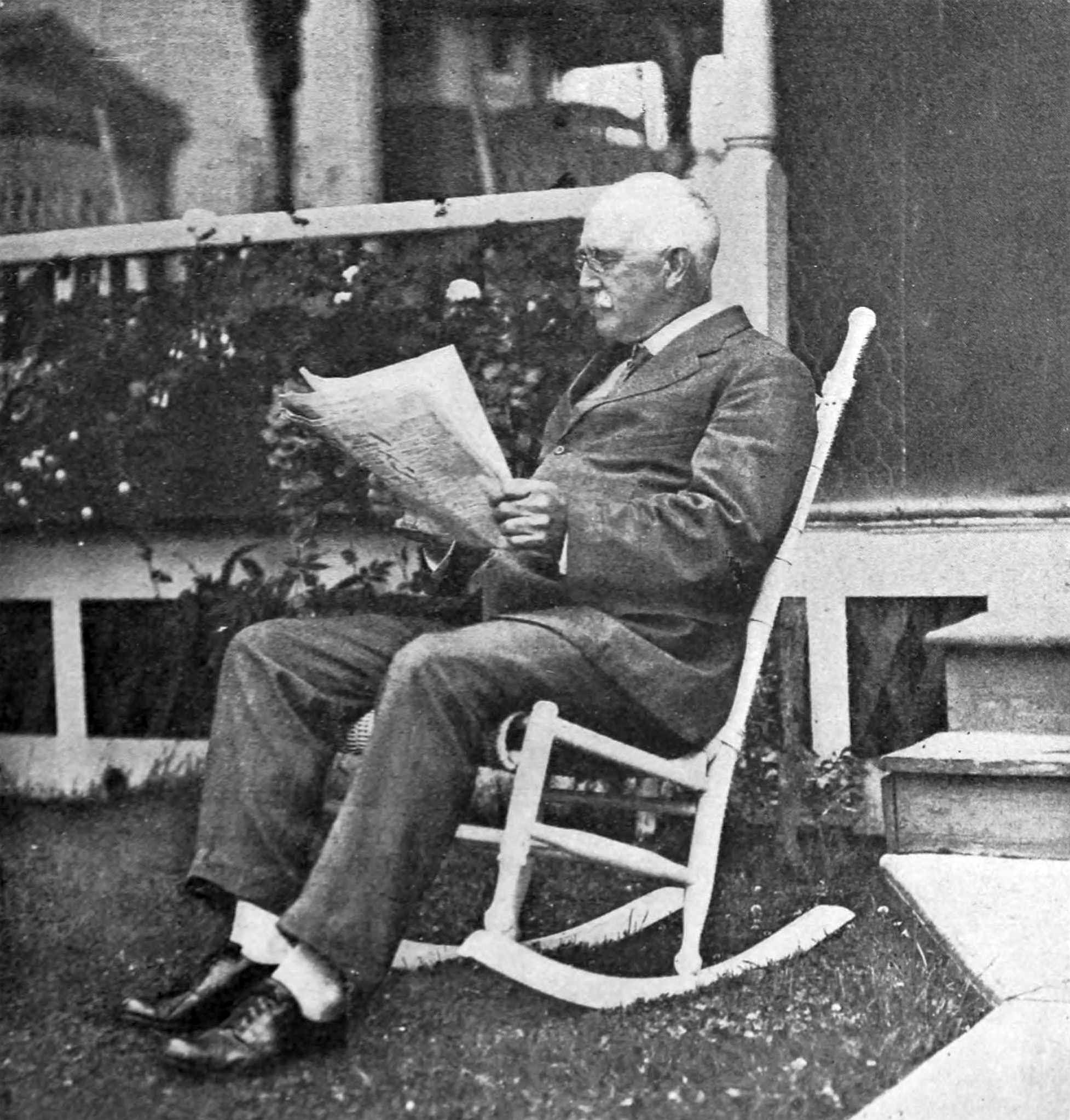
Harmon in 1911

Harmon was elected as Ohio governor in 1908. In 1910, Harmon was re-elected for a second term as governor, this time defeating future President of the United States Warren G. Harding. During his time as governor, various progressive labor laws were introduced.

=== Presidential candidate ===
In June 1912, Harmon led the Ohio delegation to the Democratic National Convention in Baltimore, Maryland. There, Harmon was nominated as a candidate for the presidency. That was largely as a favorite son of the State of Ohio, Harmon found support from elsewhere and on the first ballot of the Convention, and he received the votes of 148 delegates. However, since no candidate received the necessary two thirds of the votes, balloting continued.

By the time of the 26th ballot, no candidate had yet received the nomination for president and Harmon's support had dwindled to 29 votes, as the Convention tended to coalesce around the two leading candidates: Speaker of the House of Representatives Champ Clark of Missouri and New Jersey Governor Woodrow Wilson. Balloting continued until the 39th ballot, when the support of William Jennings Bryan helped Wilson obtain the votes necessary to become the nominee.

=== Retirement ===
Following the convention, Harmon returned home to Ohio to serve the rest of his term as governor. Accordingly, Harmon left office in January 1913 upon completing this second term. He died in late February 1927 at 81.

=== Family ===
In 1870 Judson married Olivia Scobey, the daughter of a leading physician in Hamilton. They had three daughters. Harmon and family were residents of Wyoming, OH and lived at 205 Worthington Avenue, located in the city's Village Historic District. He served as Wyoming's third Mayor and was the village's most distinguished public servant.

== Legacy ==
Harmon County, Oklahoma, is named after him.

Legal offices
Preceded by Richard Olney	United States Attorney General; 1895–1897	Succeeded by Joseph McKenna
Party political offices
Preceded by John M. Pattison	Democratic nominee for Governor of Ohio; 1908, 1910	Succeeded by James M. Cox
Political offices
Preceded by Andrew L. Harris	Governor of Ohio; 1909–1913	Succeeded by James M. Cox
