= Boulton Carbon Company =

The Boulton Carbon Company was a manufacturing company located in Cleveland, Ohio, US, from 1881 to 1886. It was devoted to the manufacture of carbon points (or carbons) used for arc lighting. The company was organized in 1881 by W. H. Boulton and Willis U. Masters and formally incorporated in 1883. A controlling interest in the company was acquired in 1886 by a group of investors led by Washington H. Lawrence. In 1886, Lawrence reorganized the Boulton Carbon Company as the National Carbon Company. Under the leadership of Lawrence, the National Carbon Company became the dominant carbon company in the United States and was one of the founding members of the Union Carbide & Carbon Company in 1917.

== History ==
In 1879, the Telegraph Supply Company of Cleveland, Ohio, introduced the United States to large scale public arc lighting with a demonstration in Cleveland's Monumental Square (now called Public Square). In 1880, the Telegraph Supply Company reorganized as the Brush Electric Company. Before the end of 1881, Brush arc light systems were lighting the streets of New York, Boston, Philadelphia, Baltimore, Montreal, Buffalo, and San Francisco. Over 6,000 lights were sold in 1881 with 1,200 lights sold to England and other foreign countries. Brush Electric installed about eighty percent of the nation's arc-lighting systems during the early 1880s. Arc lights need carbon electrodes called carbon points (or simply "carbons") to work. Each carbon would only last on the order of several hours, and then needed to be replaced.

In 1881, the use of carbons had become so widespread, and the profits had become so large, that it enticed W. H. Boulton, the foreman of the Brush Electric Company's carbon department, to leave Brush Electric. Boulton then formed a business partnership with Cleveland businessman Willis U. Masters (son of Irvine U. Masters, owner of a prominent Cleveland shipbuilding firm) to produce identical carbons, which they marketed as "Boulton Carbons". This new company, which he called the Boulton Carbon Company, became a successful supplier of carbons. The company organized and began doing business in 1881 and formally incorporated in October 1883.

The original factory works of the Boulton Carbon Company began operations in 1881 and were located on Clifton Street (now East 39th Street) between Payne Avenue and Superior Avenue, at the Pennsylvania Rail Road tracks, in East Cleveland. By 1883, the factory had a capacity of ~250,000 carbons per month (about 10% of the capacity of Brush Electric). In 1938, the factory became the home of Kichler Lighting, until they moved to Independence, Ohio, in the 1980s. The factory was gutted and remodeled in 2003–2004 and is currently the home of the Asian Town Center, a mixed use shopping center. Although remodeled, much of the original building structure is still clearly visible.

In 1885, the Boulton Carbon Company factory works were expanded to a larger facility on Willson Avenue (now East 55th Street near Euclid) between the Lake Shore & Michigan Southern and the Pennsylvania Railroad Companies lines, from which they had connecting tracks. This location afforded the company greatly increased capacity along with favorable shipping facilities and options.

By 1885, the Boulton Carbon was the second largest carbon company in the US, behind only Brush Electric. Boulton produced both plain and the copper-coated carbons.

Case Western Reserve professor Albert Michelson, who later received the Nobel Prize for his work in physics disproving the "Ether Hypothesis" by conducting the famous Michelson-Morley Experiment, visited the Boulton factory twice in 1885 in conjunction with his research.

In 1886, former Brush Electric Company Superintendent/General Manager Washington H. Lawrence led a group of investors (including Myron T. Herrick, James Parmelee and Webb Hayes) in buying a controlling interest in the Boulton Carbon Company. Lawrence reorganized it as the National Carbon Company, serving as its president until his death in 1900. Under the leadership of Lawrence, National went from a successful local carbon company to the dominant carbon company in the United States. National Carbon was one of the founding members of the Union Carbide & Carbon Company in 1917.

After being bought out by Washington Lawrence in 1886, W. H. Boulton went on to form a new carbon company, which he again called the Boulton Carbon Company (later known as the Boulton-Standard Carbon Company). Following the Carbon Bust in 1887, he was able to form an independent carbon syndicate called the Standard Carbon Company, which was headquartered in Cleveland. The syndicate was formed from the Boulton-Standard Carbon Company, the Cleveland Carbon Company, and the Crystal Carbon Company. In 1888, Boulton was fired by the company's board of directors at a lively board meeting. He then tried to form another Boulton Carbon Company (with a new factory located at Lake and Belden Streets in Cleveland), but was eventually stopped by a lawsuit brought by his fellow board members at Standard Carbon.

Left destitute from his struggles with the Standard Carbon Co., Boulton left Cleveland and settled in Buffalo. By 1890, along with P. C. Hoddick, he started the Black Rock Carbon Company in Buffalo, New York. In 1891, Boulton entered another carbon related position as the superintendent of the Aluminum Carbon Company, with offices at Room 69 of the Coal and Iron Exchange in Buffalo, and a factory at Lancaster, New York. By 1894, he had formed the Boulton & Crown Carbon Company with a factory on 17th Street in North Tonawanda, New York. That factory closed, reportedly due to poor quality product, in the spring of 1896. For a brief time in 1896, Boulton went to work for the Prudential Life Insurance Company to make ends meet.

In August 1896, his second eldest son, Frank, died of a sunstroke. Destitute and now despondent from the death of his son, Boulton attempted to commit suicide on September 9, 1896, with a combination of a morphine overdose and chloroform. The attempt happened in Prospect Park in Buffalo. When found by the police, Boulton had a note in his pocket that read: "I have swallowed 20 grains of morphine and have put myself to sleep with chloroform. If I ever wake up again, I will cut my throat with a razor that I have in my pocket, as I am determined to commit suicide. P.S. – If anyone finds me before I am dead, I hope that they will not bring me back to consciousness, as I don't want to live." There is no information available on W. H. Boulton after that date.

== Legacy ==
Over the years, the company has had many names: the Boulton Carbon Company; the National Carbon Company; National Carbon Division, Union Carbide and Carbon Corporation; National Carbon Company, a Division of the Union Carbide and Carbon Corporation; Carbon Products Division of Union Carbide; the UCAR Carbon Company; UCAR International; and is now known as GrafTech International Holdings. Notable offspring from the company include KEMET Laboratories (capacitor technologies), Cytec Industries', Engineered Materials group (carbon fiber products), Energizer Holdings (batteries), Advanced Energy Technologies (graphite electronics thermal management, fire suppression, and fluid sealing products), and National Specialty Products (carbon and graphite specialty products).
