= W. H. Lawrence =

W. H. Lawrence may refer to:

- Bill Lawrence (news personality) (1916—1972), American journalist
- Washington H. Lawrence (1840-1900), founder of National Carbon Company and Eveready Battery Company
