= Eveready Industries India =

Indian battery manufacturer in Kolkata pvt ltd

Eveready Industries India Ltd.
- Type: Public
- Traded as: NSE: EVEREADY; BSE: 531508
- Industry: Consumer electronics; Electrical equipments; Energy
- Founded: 1905; 121 years ago
- Headquarters: Kolkata, West Bengal, India
- Area served: India
- Products: Batteries; flashlights; lanterns; lamps; luminaires
- Brands: Eveready; Powercell; Uniross
- Owners: Burman family (38.38%)
- Website: evereadyindia.com

Eveready Industries India Ltd. (EIIL) (originally known as Union Carbide India Limited (UCIL)) is an Indian company that manufactures and markets batteries, lighting products, and related products. The Eveready brand has been present in India since 1905.

U.S. and Indian courts have held UCIL, as it was known at the time, responsible for the Bhopal disaster which occurred in 1984, one of the world's largest industrial disasters. It led to over 500,000 injuries and at least 3,787 deaths.

EIIL is the world's third largest producer of carbon zinc batteries, selling more than a billion units a year. EIIL is India's largest selling brand of dry cell batteries and flashlights (torches), with dominant market shares of about 46% and 85% respectively. The Group's operating facilities are located at Kolkata, Bengaluru, Noida, Haridwar, Lucknow and Matia (Assam).

== History ==
=== Early history ===
EIIL started its operation in India in 1905. The first dry cell batteries were imported from the US and sold in the major cities of the country. These batteries were primarily used in imported torches.

In 1939, the company set up its first battery plant in Kolkata. This was followed by another battery manufacturing plant in Chennai in the year 1952. A torch manufacturing plant was set up at Lucknow in 1958. Today it is one of the largest torch manufacturing plants in South East Asia. The plant manufactures a wide range of brass, aluminum, and plastic torches.

=== Modern History ===
By the time of the Bhopal Disaster in 1984, the company was ranked twenty-first in size among companies operating in India. It had revenues of Rs 2 billion (then equivalent to US$170 million). Fifty-one percent of the company (known at the time as UCIL) was owned by Union Carbide Corporation; remaining shares were held by 24,000 stockholders. Ten thousand people were employed in five operating divisions that manufactured batteries, carbon products, welding equipment, plastics, industrial chemicals, pesticides, and marine products. EIIL became part of the Williamson Magor Group through McLeod Russel Ltd in the latter half of 1994 following the sale of Union Carbide Corporation's stake in UCIL. UCIL is primarily a dry-cell battery manufacturer at the time, but as part of the Williamson Magor Group EIIL launched three brands of packet tea under the Greendale Brand umbrella – Tez, Jaago and Premium Gold. Coupled with EIIL's brands of packet tea are now easily available in most states in India. In 1997, the Eveready brand was extended to its packet tea business. McLeod Russel Ltd. eventually merged with Eveready Industries.

EIIL has the licence for the Eveready brand only in India, Bhutan and Nepal from Energizer Holdings, so it had to create a new brand for export to other markets where Energizer Holdings still has the rights to the Eveready brand. The brand LAVA was launched in 1999. LAVA batteries and flashlights have been sold in Dubai, Bahrain, Jordan, Sudan, Egypt, Bangladesh, Mauritius, Sri Lanka, Azerbaijan, Mexico, US, Lebanon, Saudi Arabia, Ethiopia and Nigeria.

During the fiscal year 2002, the group sold its wholly owned subsidiaries Dufflaghur Investments Limited and Natex Investment and Marketing Limited.

In 2005, EIIL celebrated its 100 anniversary in India. That same year, EIIL separated its bulk tea business and de-merged as McLeod Russel. EIIL also acquired BPL Soft Energy System in 2005.

In February 2022, the Burman family, which held a 19.84% stake in Eveready, made an open offer to acquire an additional 26% stake for ₹604 crore. Following this, Chairman Aditya Khaitan and Managing Director Amritanshu Khaitan accepted the offer and resigned from the company.

=== Timeline ===
- 1905: National Carbon starts its Indian operations with the sale of batteries imported from the USA.
- 1926: Ever Ready Company India sets up the first arc carbon factory at Canal Road, Kolkata.
- 1934: Eveready Company incorporated as a private company on 12 November.
- 1939: Camperdown Works – first modern battery plant established at Cossipore in Kolkata.
- 1941: Union Batteries merges with Eveready Company and the name is changed to National Carbon Company.
- 1951: Renamed as Union Carbide India Ltd, a subsidiary of worldwide multinational, Union Carbide Corporation.
- 1958: Company set its torch manufacturing plant in Lucknow, one of the largest in South Asia.
- 1959: Name of the company changed to Union Carbide India Limited.
- 1984: Bhopal disaster at Union Carbide India LTD plant in Bhopal.

The Bhopal disaster took place in the early hours of the morning of 3 December 1984, in the heart of the city of Bhopal in the Indian state of Madhya Pradesh. A Union Carbide subsidiary pesticide plant released 40 tonnes of methyl isocyanate (MIC) gas, immediately killing nearly 3,000 people and ultimately causing at least 15,000 to 22,000 total deaths. Bhopal is frequently cited as one of the world's worst industrial disasters. The International Medical Commission on Bhopal was established in 1993 to respond to the disasters.

- 1995: Sale of shares of Union Carbide Corporation in Union Carbide India Ltd to McLeod Russel (I) Ltd. belonging to the Williamson Magor Group and a new name – Eveready Industries India Ltd (EIIL).
- 1996: McLeod Russel (India) Ltd, merged with EIIL, bulk tea business brought into EIIL fold.
- 2000: Bishnauth Tea Company merged with Eveready Industries India Ltd.
- 2005: Brand became hundred years old
- 2009: EIIL acquires controlling stake in Uniross SA of France, which is a leading rechargeable battery manufacturer.

== Products ==
Eveready Industries have business interests spreading across batteries, flashlights, lighting and packed Tea.

Batteries

- Zinc-carbon battery: A zinc-carbon battery which is commonly used for toys, cameras, flashlights (torches), Walkmans, CD players, radios, clocks and cordless mikes.
- Alkaline Battery: Eveready Ultima Alkaline battery is used in electronic gadgets.
- Rechargeable Battery: 'Eveready Recharge' is one of the pioneers as a brand of rechargeable batteries and chargers to be introduced in India.
- Battery Guide

Flashlights

- digiLED Torches: These torches use LEDs in place of the incandescent bulbs.
- Brass TorcheS
- Aluminium & Plastic Torches

Lighting

- Compact Fluorescent Lamps: In 2007, Eveready forayed into the lighting business with the launch of a range of Compact Fluorescent Lamps.
- Halogen Lamps: Eveready offers halogen lamps for outdoor lighting and video-shooting.
- General lighting service/incandescent lamps: A range of incandescent bulbs in different sizes, voltages, and colors are used widely in household and commercial lighting, apart from portable, decorative and advertising lighting.

== Marketing ==
In 1992, Rediffusion Y&R, the agency on record, released the 'Give me Red' tagline that Eveready Industry continues to use. In 2004, Amitabh Bachchan was appointed as brand ambassador for two years, during which the agency came up with another 'Give me Red' campaign. In 2009, Eveready released an ad titled 'Boxing'.

Eveready Industries has launched an advertising campaign for Eveready Ultima Batteries. The animation team created controlled trails of light derived from light painting. Recognizable shapes were made with a torch and captured on a digital still camera. The film comprises over 3000 such photographs, played back quickly, one after the other, like in a flicker book.

== See also ==
- Bhopal disaster
- British Ever Ready Electrical Company
- Energizer
- Eveready East Africa
- Union Carbide
