= Myron T. Herrick =

American politician (1854–1929)

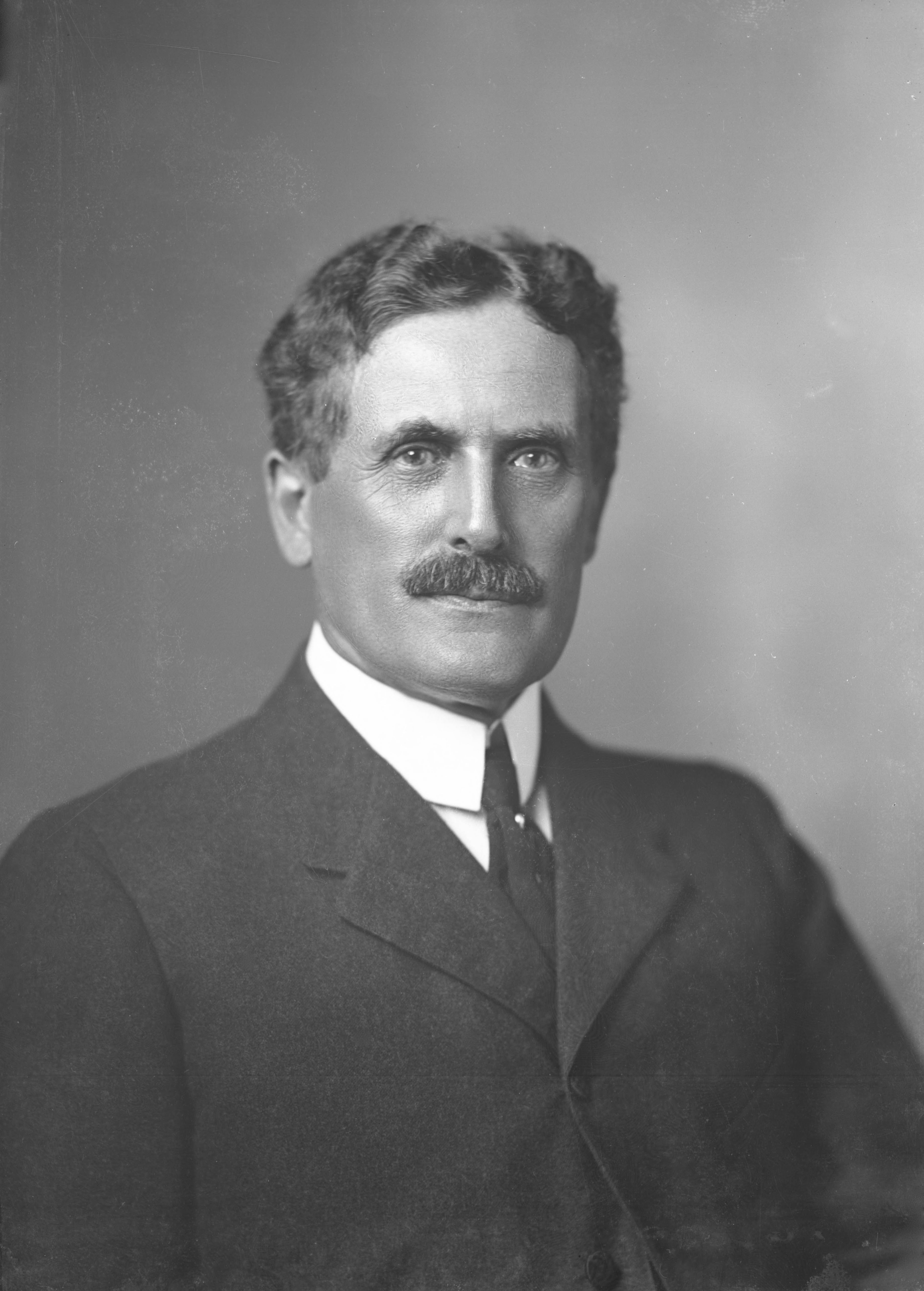
- Official portrait, 1905

42nd Governor of Ohio
- In office January 11, 1904 – January 8, 1906
- Lieutenant: Warren G. Harding
- Preceded by: George K. Nash
- Succeeded by: John M. Pattison

U.S. Ambassador to France
- In office 1912–1914
- President: William Howard Taft; Woodrow Wilson
- Preceded by: Robert Bacon
- Succeeded by: William Graves Sharp
- In office 1921–1929
- President: Warren G. Harding; Calvin Coolidge
- Preceded by: Hugh Campbell Wallace
- Succeeded by: Walter Evans Edge

Personal details
- Born: Myron Timothy Herrick; October 9, 1854 Huntington, Lorain County, Ohio, U.S.
- Died: March 31, 1929 (aged 74) Paris, France
- Resting place: Lake View Cemetery, Cleveland, Ohio, U.S.
- Party: Republican
- Spouse: Caroline Marina Parmely
- Children: 1
- Education: Oberlin College; Ohio Wesleyan University
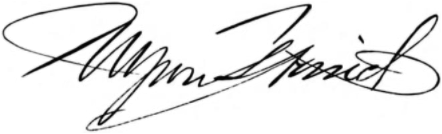
- Signature

Myron Timothy Herrick (October 9, 1854 – March 31, 1929) was an American banker, diplomat and Republican politician from Ohio. He served as the 42nd governor of Ohio and United States Ambassador to France on two occasions.

== Biography ==
Herrick was born in Huntington, Lorain County, Ohio, the son of Mary (Hulburt) Herrick and Colonel Timothy Robinson Herrick, a local farmer and businessman. He studied at Oberlin College and Ohio Wesleyan University, but graduated from neither. He married Caroline Marina Parmely of Dayton, Ohio, on June 30, 1880. They had one son, Parmely Webb Herrick (1881–1937).

== Career ==
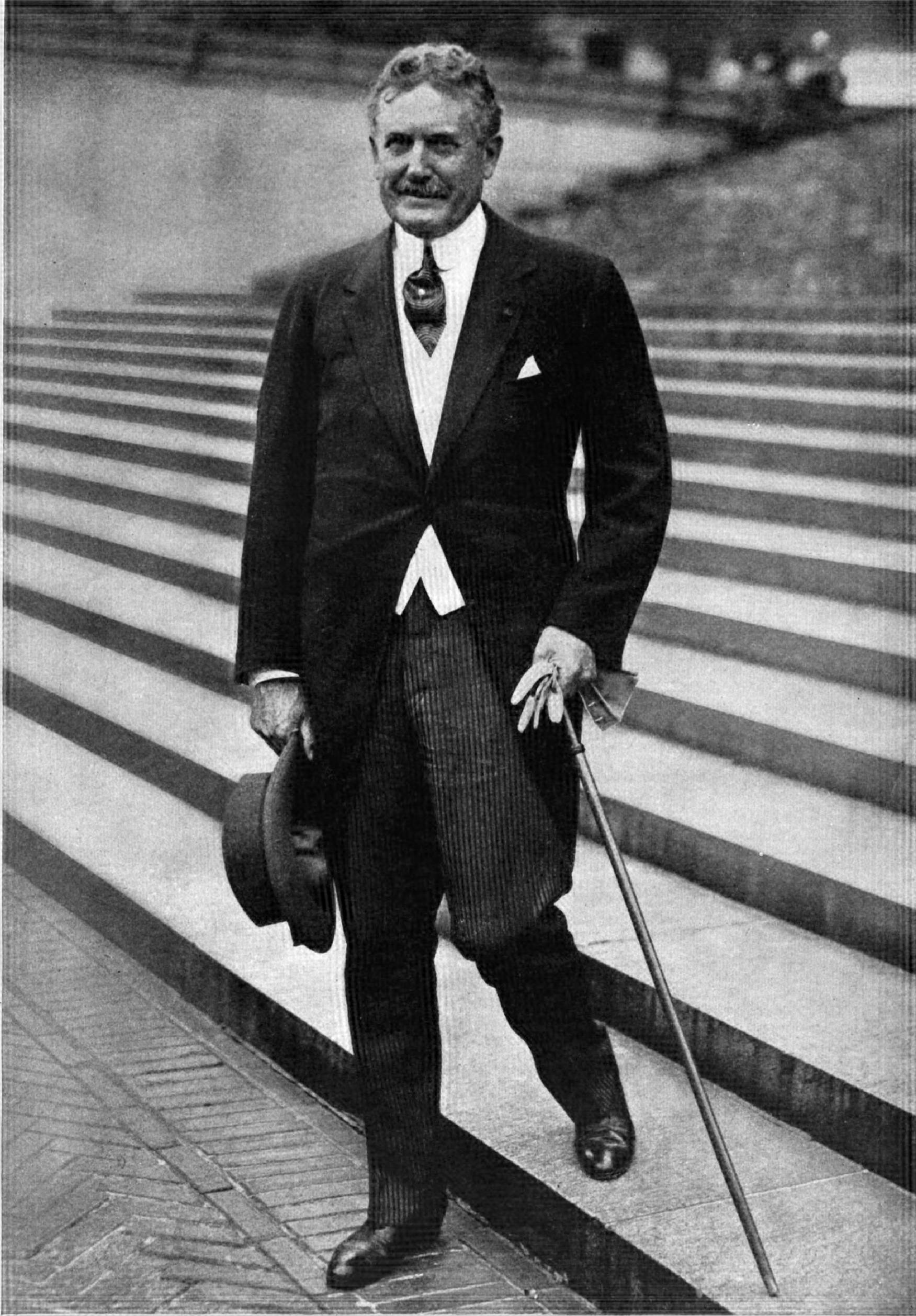
Herrick in 1915

Admitted to practice law in Cleveland in 1878, Herrick joined the bank Society for Savings as secretary and treasurer in 1886, and became the bank's president in 1894.

From 1885 to 1888, Herrick was a member of the Cleveland City Council. In 1886, in Cleveland, he helped to finance the founding of The National Carbon Company, along with W. H. Lawrence, James Parmelee, and James Webb Cook Hayes, son of U.S. President Rutherford B. Hayes. This company, a predecessor of Union Carbide, Energizer, and Eveready, would come to figure prominently in the history of the consumer battery and the flashlight.

Herrick was a Presidential elector in 1892 for Harrison/Reid.

While governor-elect in 1902, Herrick gave $20,000 to the village of Wellington, Ohio, to build the library now known as the Herrick Memorial Library. Herrick later bequeathed $70,000 for an addition.

Herrick served as the governor of Ohio from 1904 to 1906; (future United States President) Warren G. Harding served as his lieutenant governor. He had been a protégé of political boss Mark Hanna, but in 1906 was defeated by the efforts of Wayne Wheeler and the Anti-Saloon League after he refused to support their plan for the prohibition of alcohol in Ohio.

Herrick contributed to French-American amity before and during World War I. He was United States Ambassador to France from 1912 to 1914 and again from 1921 to 1929. He is the only American ambassador to France with a street—an avenue—named after him in Paris, in the 8th arrondissement. As ambassador, Herrick hosted Charles Lindbergh in Paris after his successful New York-to-Paris Atlantic crossing in 1927.

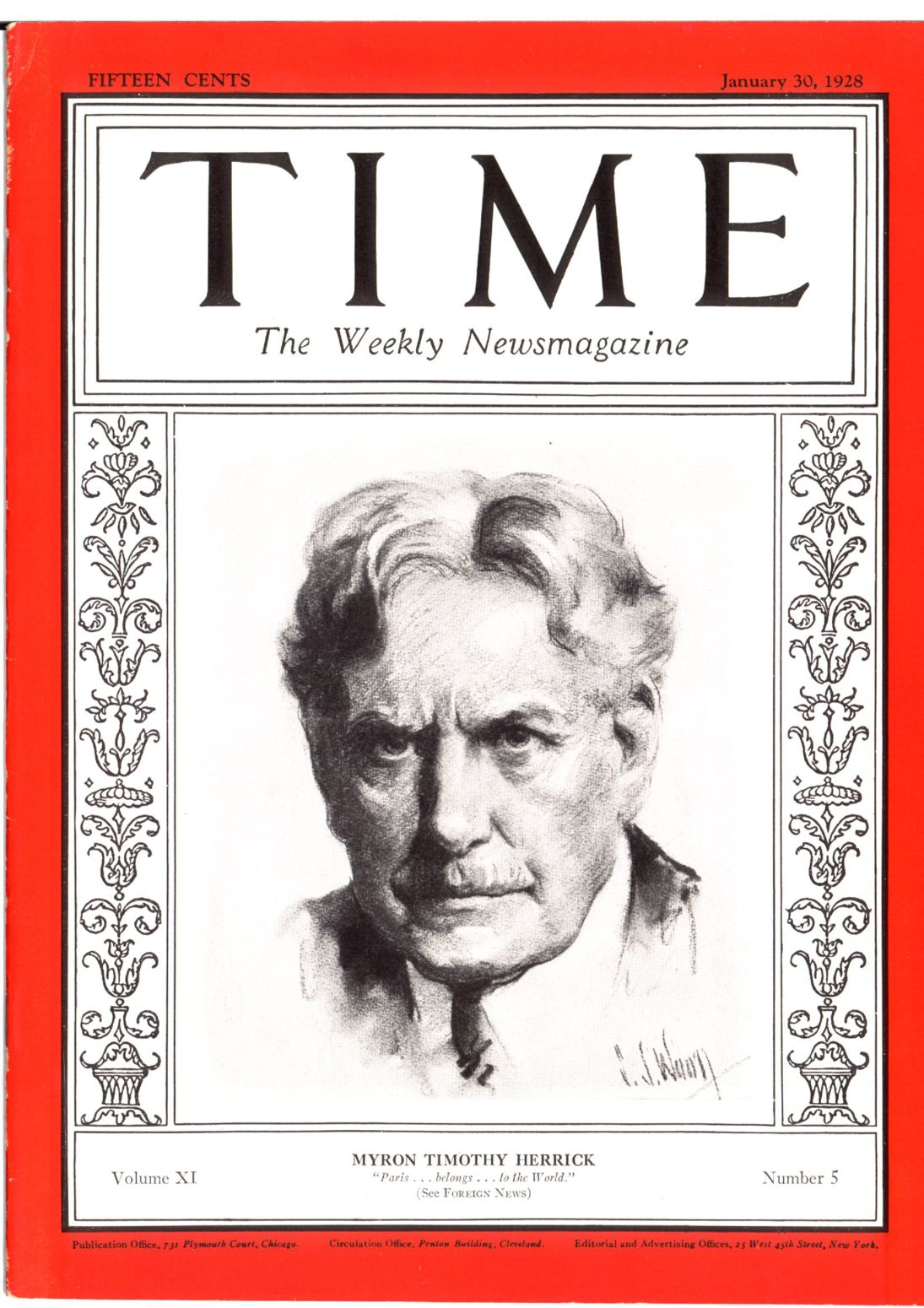
Time cover, January 1928

Upon his return to the United States in 1914, Herrick's prominent role in helping Americans stranded by the outbreak of World War I led to discussion within the Republican Party of Herrick as a possible nominee in the upcoming 1916 presidential election. Herrick believed that his business background would prove a liability, and when his candidacy failed to gain traction, he tried and failed to defeat incumbent Democratic Senator Atlee Pomerene in 1916.

== Death ==
Herrick was serving as United States Ambassador to France at the time of his death on March 31, 1929. He died from a heart attack.

He was interred at Lake View Cemetery in Cleveland, Ohio.

Party political offices
Preceded by George K. Nash	Republican Party nominee for Governor of Ohio; 1903, 1905	Succeeded by Andrew L. Harris
First	Republican nominee for U.S. Senator from Ohio (Class 1); 1916	Succeeded by Simeon D. Fess
Diplomatic posts
Preceded by Robert Bacon	United States Ambassador to France; 1914–1919	Succeeded by William Graves Sharp
Preceded by Hugh Campbell Wallace	United States Ambassador to France; 1921–1929	Succeeded by Walter Evans Edge
