= Washington H. Lawrence =

Washington Herbert Lawrence (January 17, 1840 – November 23, 1900) was a pioneer in the manufacture of electrical and carbon products who organized and served as the first president of the National Carbon Company, one of the founding members of the Union Carbide & Carbon Corporation.

Washington H. Lawrence

== Family and early life ==
Born on January 17, 1840, in Olmsted, Ohio, to Joel B. Lawrence, a farmer and miller, of Pepperill, Massachusetts, and Catherine (Harris) Lawrence (April 9, 1793 – 1853) of Little Rest, Dateless County, New York. This branch of the Lawrence family are said to be direct lineal descendants of Robert Lawrence, of Lancashire, England, who was knighted by Richard Coeur de Lion, as Sir Robert of Ashton Hall, for bravery displayed at the Siege of Acre (1189–1191). John Lawrence, the ancestor of the American branch of the family, came from England in 1635, and settled in Wolverton, Massachusetts. In 1833, Joel B. Lawrence up-rooted his family from the East and was one of the early settlers in the Western Reserve at what came to be Olmstead, Ohio. Here he took up a tract of land, established a mill, and reared his family (consisting of Washington and at least two other sons). Joel B Lawrence died in 1851 and his wife Catherine died two years later in 1853, leaving Washington an orphan at the age of thirteen.

As a teenager, Washington Lawrence attended Olmsted common schools and worked as clerk in a store in Berea, Ohio. He later attended classes at Baldwin University (now Baldwin-Wallace University). While at the university, he was befriended by both Milton Baldwin and his father, the namesake of the university, the Honorable John Baldwin. After a short time, Milton and Washington were sent by John Baldwin to Kansas to manage a large milling construction project along with a substantial and real-estate interest, with the plan that Milton and Washington would oversee operations when the mills were completed. Milton Baldwin died before the mills were completed, but Washington was still entrusted to perform the job. Washington Lawrence proved to be a successful manager, despite his age.

In 1859, at the age of nineteen, he left Kansas to go into business with his brother in a general store in Hannibal, Missouri. There, his business carried him over Kansas and Missouri, and he saw much of frontier life. He remained there until 1861, when his brother joined the Union army and they closed up their business. In 1861, Washington returned to Ohio and formed a partnership with another brother, in the management of the family mills and farm at Olmsted. He continued in the town for several years, living at the old home his father had built. He married in 1863 and in 1864, he came to Cleveland to settle permanently.

== Business success ==
In 1864, he associated himself with N. S. C. Perkins and W. A. Mack in the manufacture of the "Domestic" sewing machine. After the business had been well established and become successful, he disposed of his interest in the company, and became associated with B. P. Howe in the sale of the Howe sewing machine. In connection with this, in 1872 he engaged in the manufacture of bolts at Elyria, Ohio in what developed into the Cleveland Tap & Screw Company. In 1874 he sold his interest to the company; he also sold his interest in the Howe agencies.

During 1874, Washington next turned his attention to new field of electricity. Recognizing its commercial value, Lawrence invested as a stockholder in Cleveland's Telegraph Supply Company. Lawrence took over the position of company secretary and held the post until the 1880 reorganization of the company into the Brush Electric Company, at which point he became superintendent/general manager. Lawrence served as general manager until he retired in 1882 and sold his company interests. For the next four years, Lawrence turned his attentions a quiet life, managing his Cleveland real estate investments.

== National Carbon Company ==
In 1886, Lawrence returned to the carbon manufacturing business when he purchased the controlling interest in the Boulton Carbon Company from W. H. Boulton. The company had been started by Boulton, the former manager of the carbon department of Brush Electric. In 1881, Boulton left Brush and partnered with Cleveland businessman Willis U. Masters to form the new company. Boulton's primary product was carbon electrodes, known as "carbon points" or simply "carbons". These carbons were used for arc lighting, the principle electric light at the time. Willis U. Masters soon retired due to poor health. Lawrence brought in a group of investors including Myron T. Herrick, James Parmelee and Webb Hayes.

In 1886, under the leadership of Washington Lawrence, the new management team at Boulton Carbon immediately went to work on two items. First was the total reorganization of the manufacturing department and second was the changing of the company name from the Boulton Carbon Company to the National Carbon Company. They then hired the most competent mechanical engineers available, along with one of the most experienced chemists in the city. The result was that they took a highly manual and variable process and converted it to a process that was, as far as was possible, automated from the time the raw carbon was received at the factory until the finished carbon points were placed in the stock room.

In 1891 Lawrence purchased the carbon department from Brush Electric. Even with the acquisition, capacity issues continued for National. To gain capacity, a new National Carbon factory was built in Lakewood, a suburb adjoining Cleveland to the west. Started in 1892 and occupied in early 1894, the new factory was located on 115 acres of ground along the New York Central rail line, about a mile south of Lake Erie on Madison Avenue at Highland Avenue (now West 117th Street). This new factory, known as "The Cleveland Works" or "Factory A", has been in continuous use for almost 120 years by National Carbon and its successor companies.

In 1896, National Carbon manufactured the "Columbia", the first mass-produced consumer "dry cell" battery, used to power home telephones. In 1898, National Carbon introduced the "D" cell battery. By 1899, Russian immigrant, Conrad Hubert was using these batteries to power his new novelty item, the first "Ever Ready" flashlight.

Under the leadership of Lawrence, and his successors, National Carbon developed a strategy of buying their competitors. By 1906, they had acquired over 20 other battery and carbon companies. In 1914, National bought the American Ever Ready Company, thus acquiring the Eveready trademark. In 1917, National Carbon became one of the founding members of the Union Carbide and Carbon Corporation.

== Personal life ==
Lawrence married Harriet E. Collister, of Cleveland, on June 29, 1863. They moved to a home in Dover Bay, Ohio, and had seven daughters. As of 1917, the eldest, Ella D. had married W. O. Mathews. Cora B. had married Frank Wayland Brown and had one son, Wayland W. Brown. The third daughter, Ida M., married Walter James and had two sons, Lawrence James, and William Rees James. Irene had married Fred R. Fuller, and was the mother of two sons, Lawrence De Wolf Fuller, and John Lawrence Fuller. Maude and Myrtle were twin sisters. Myrtle married James Seth Adams, was the mother of James S. Adams, Jr. Winifred, the youngest daughter, and Maude were not married as of 1917.

Around 1864, Lawrence purchased a tract of land consisting of one hundred and twenty-five acres along a high bluff overlooking Lake Erie, just east of the intersection of Lake and Clague Road in Dover Bay Park (now Bay Village, Ohio). He not only built a modern home on the site, but adjacent to his own house, he built several cottages, which in summer were occupied by friends. He has also leased ground to a number of the prominent men of Cleveland, upon which they also built substantial summer homes.

In July 1899, Lawrence broke his arm while playing tennis at his Dover Bay Country Club. The break was reported to have happened by the simple act of throwing a tennis ball into the air. Although the break to his arm was not at first thought to be anything out of the ordinary, the bone did not properly knit. Later that summer, he fell down the elevator shaft while inspecting the construction of his house. Further complications ensued that necessitated the amputation of his arm on November 20, 1900. Lawrence did not recover from the shock of the amputation operation and died on November 23, 1900. Lawrence is buried in Lake View Cemetery in Cleveland, Ohio.
