= UCIL =

UCIL may refer to:

- Union Carbide India Limited, a pesticide production company infamously known for the Bhopal disaster which occurred on the night of 2–3 December 1984 at the Union Carbide India Limited pesticide plant in Bhopal, India, referred as the worst industrial catastrophe.
- Uranium Corporation of India, a centrally owned corporation, under the Department of Atomic Energy of India for Uranium mining and Uranium Processing.
