= Union Carbide Headquarters =

Union Carbide Headquarters might refer to one of the following buildings that served at the corporate headquarters of the Union Carbide company:

- 30 East 42nd Street, New York, 1924-1960
- 270 Park Avenue (1960–2021), New York, 1960-1982
- The Corporate Center, Danbury (Connecticut), 1982-2001
