= GrafTech =

American graphite and petroleum company

GrafTech International Ltd.
- Company type: Public company
- Traded as: NYSE: EAF; Russell 1000 Index component
- Founded: 1886; 140 years ago
- Headquarters: Brooklyn Heights, Ohio
- Number of locations: 14
- Area served: International
- Key people: David J. Rintoul, Chairman & CEO
- Products: Graphite electrodes Petroleum coke
- Revenue: ▲$1.363 billion (YTD 2018)
- Net income: ▲$0.624 billion (YTD 2018)
- Total assets: ▲$1.502 billion (2018)
- Total equity: ▼ -$1.038 billion (2018)
- Owner: Brookfield Asset Management (55%)
- Number of employees: 1,370 (2018)
- Website: www.graftech.com

GrafTech International Ltd. is a manufacturer of graphite electrodes and petroleum coke, which are essential for the production of electric arc furnace steel and other metals. Headquartered in Brooklyn Heights, Ohio, it has manufacturing facilities in Calais, France;Pamplona, Spain; Monterrey, Mexico; and St. Marys, Pennsylvania.

== History ==
The company was founded in 1886 as the National Carbon Company, which in 1917 was acquired by Union Carbide and became its Carbon Products Division.

In 1914, the company introduced the first 12-inch-diameter graphite electrodes.

In 1956, the company received an Academy Award for the development and production of a high-efficiency yellow flame carbon for motion picture color photography.

Between 1956 and 1978, the company developed high-performance carbon fibers; this would be recognized in 2003 with a National Historic Chemical Landmark from the American Chemical Society.

In 1985, the company developed advanced technology for carbon/carbon composite material used in spacecraft.

Union Carbide was reorganized in 1989, renaming the Carbon Products Division as the UCAR Carbon Company.

In 1990, the company introduced first 30-inch-diameter graphite electrodes for UHP DC arc furnaces.

In 1995, the company developed new graphite for the US Advanced Battery Consortium for a lithium-ion battery in electric vehicles.

In 1995, the company became a public company via an initial public offering.

In 1999, the company developed first natural graphite-based heat spreaders for electronic thermal management.

In 2002, the company changed its name from UCAR to Graftech.

In 2004, the company introduced optimized pinless joint design for large-diameter graphite electrodes.

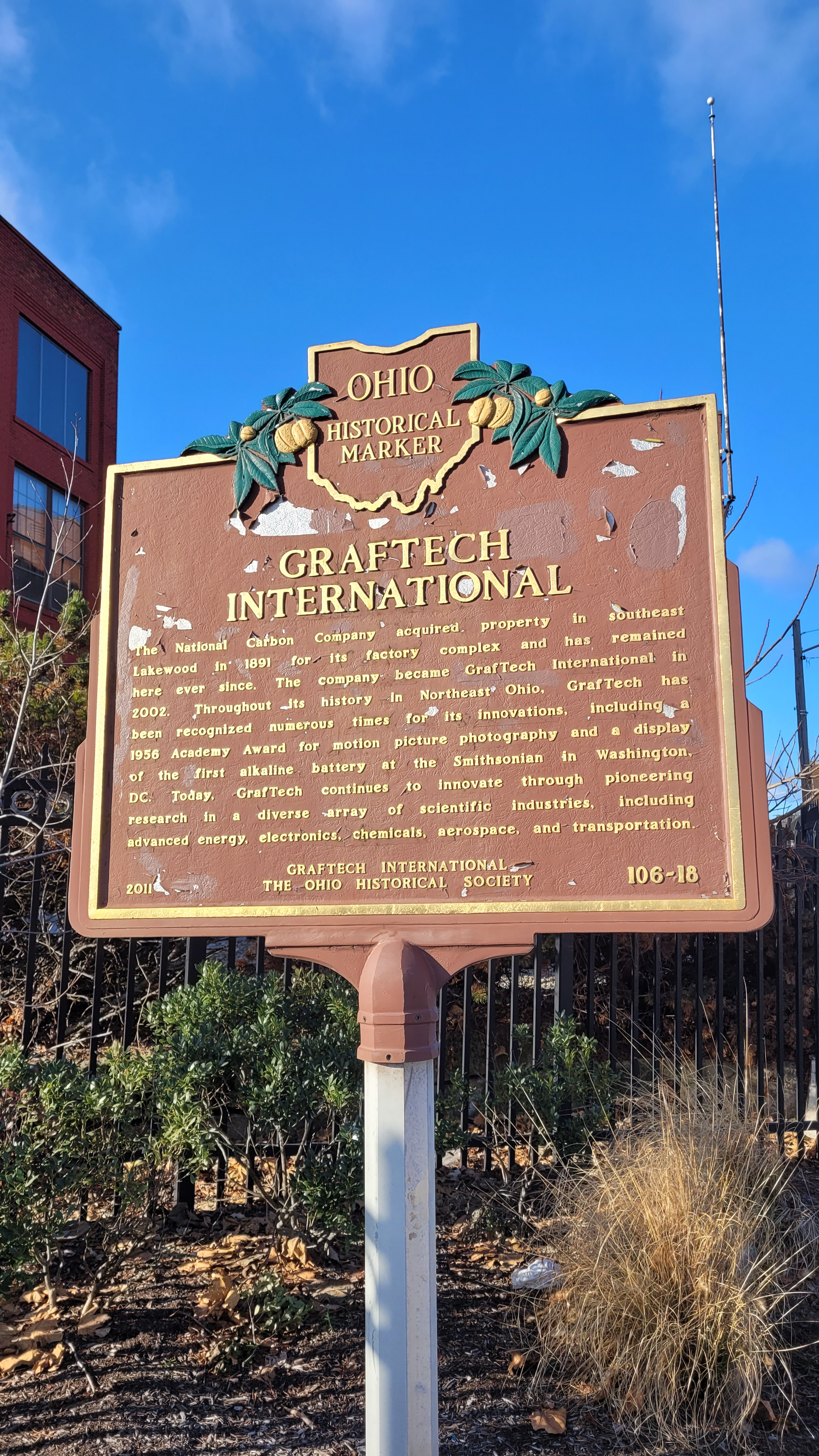
The Lakewood historical marker, located in the Birdtown neighborhood.

In 2007, the company commercialized high-temperature insulation solutions for the polysilicon and solar energy industries.

In 2010, the company launched high thermal conductivity SPREADERSHIELD™ products for electronics and lighting applications.

In 2010, GrafTech acquired two companies: Seadrift Coke LP, a manufacturer of petroleum coke, an essential component in the production of graphite electrodes; and C/G Electrodes LLC, which manufactures graphite electrodes.

In March 2011, the company acquired Micron Research Corporation, a manufacturer of superfine-grained graphite.

In October 2011, the company acquired advanced carbon composite manufacturer Fiber Materials, which it would sell in 2016.

In 2011, the company was awarded two historical markers by the Ohio Historical Society. One is for pioneering battery research made at Parma by Lewis Urry and National Carbon Company. The other recognizes the Lakewood facility’s long history and National Carbon Company.

In August 2015, GrafTech was acquired by Brookfield Asset Management.

In 2017, the company sold its NeoGraf and Advanced Graphite Materials divisions to focus on graphite electrodes and petroleum coke.

In April 2018, the company once again became a public company via an initial public offering.

== Controversies ==
On April 1, 1998, the company was subject to a class action lawsuit for allegedly artificially inflating stock price. In 2000, the company settled the lawsuit for $40.5 million.

In April 1998, the company was fined $110 million by the United States Department of Justice and in July 2001, the company was fined €50.4 million by the European Commission for participating in an international price fixing cartel with 7 other firms in the market for graphite electrodes.
