= Uniross =

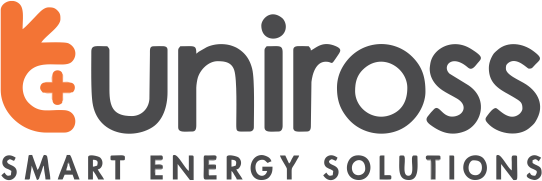
- Industry: Electronics
- Founded: 1968; 57 years ago in Bristol, England

Uniross is a European manufacturer of rechargeable batteries. Founded in the United Kingdom, it is now headquartered in France.

It is a brand with presence mainly in Europe & UK markets. Established in 1968 in Bristol, UK it primarily deals in manufacturing of consumer & industrial batteries, chargers & lighting products.

== History ==
Founded in 1968 in Bristol, UK, the company became extremely popular with its rechargeable batteries and commanded a market share of 60% in the UK's retail market in 2006. Uniross over the years underwent many changes before being presently controlled by a French group. The company since its last takeover in 2012 has diversified its portfolio and also ventured into portable lighting and now offers LED home lights and portable LED products like flashlights and headlamps. Uniross products have their presence in over 70 countries mainly in the EU, UK and SE Asia region.

== See also ==
- Flashlight
- Eveready East Africa
- Ucar batteries
- British Ever Ready Electrical Company
- P. R. Mallory and Co Inc
- Gold Peak
