= Birdtown =

Cleveland neighborhood

Coordinates: 41°28′31″N 81°46′37″W

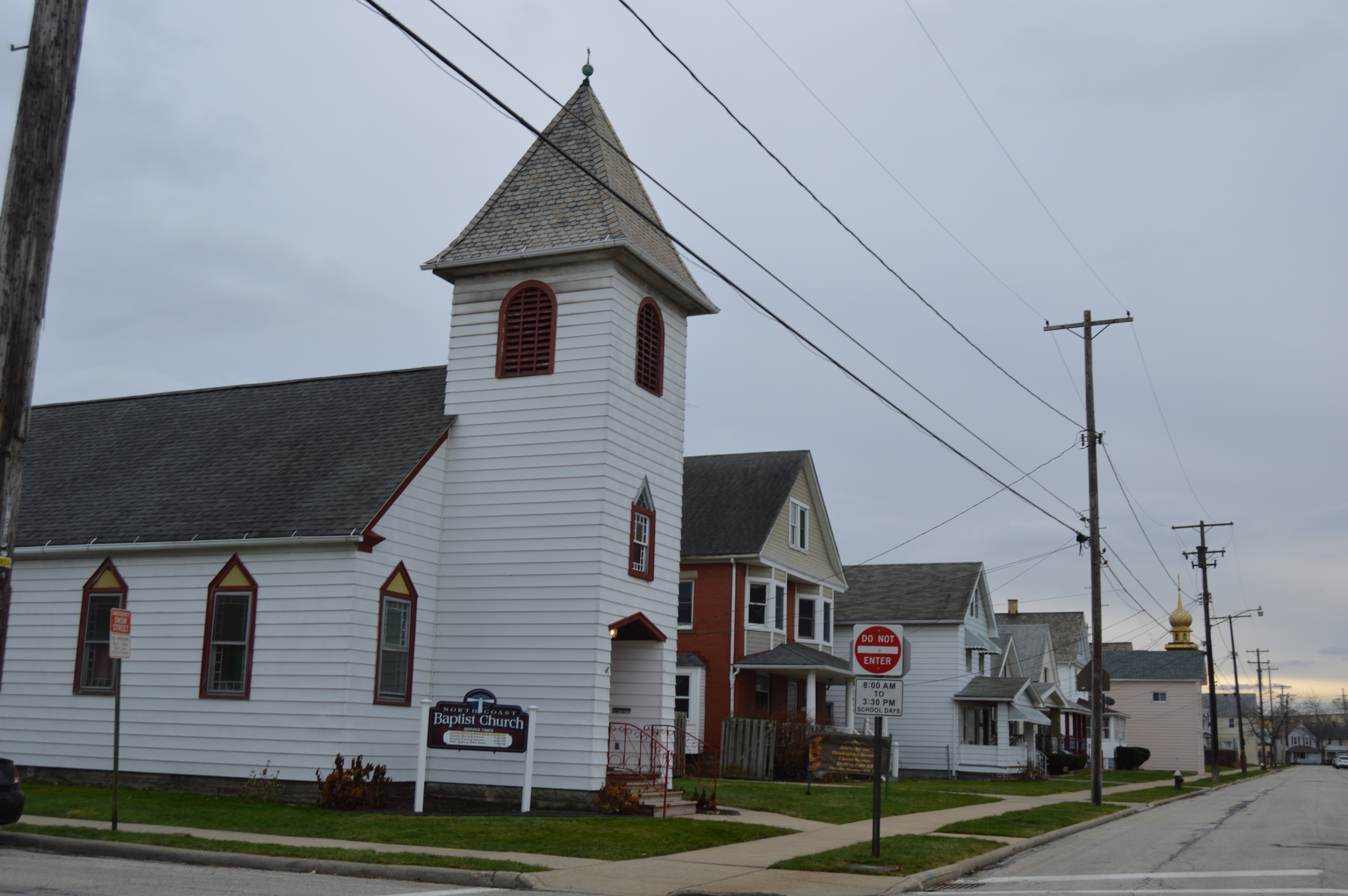
North Coast Baptist Church sits next to houses at the intersection of Quail and Thrush streets

Birdtown is a neighborhood in Lakewood, a streetcar suburb of Cleveland, Ohio.

== History ==
In 1891 the National Carbon Company (now NeoGraf Solutions) occupied the corner of Madison Avenue and West 117th Street at the Cleveland-Lakewood border. It manufactured batteries and developed the carbon filtered gas mask. The company employed recent immigrants, primarily Slovaks and other eastern Europeans in its growing manufacturing business. Often workers were encouraged to bring family members to work to join the force. Most of the employees lived in Cleveland neighborhoods and would travel muddy and icy roads to the site. The lack of any public transportation made the trip challenging to arrive to work on time. In 1892, National Carbon sought a solution to the problem.

The company acquired 155 acres to the west of the factory to Halstead Avenue and developed over 400 residential parcels to accommodate factory employees and their families. The Pleasant Hill Land Company worked with company employees to develop homes in the area by offering reduced down payments and favorable financing. Many families built their homes personally during their time away from the factories. By 1910, nearly 2200 residents called this area home. The neighborhood was reminiscent of company towns like Pullman, Illinois and Homestead, Pennsylvania. Pullman was entirely company-owned and provided housing, markets, a library, churches and entertainment for employees who were required to live there. Homestead, was a steel town which grew among workers around the burgeoning steel industry along the Monongahela River in the late 1800s. Birdtown, a neighborhood within Lakewood, represented a community fostered by the company but built and owned by the residents.

== Name ==
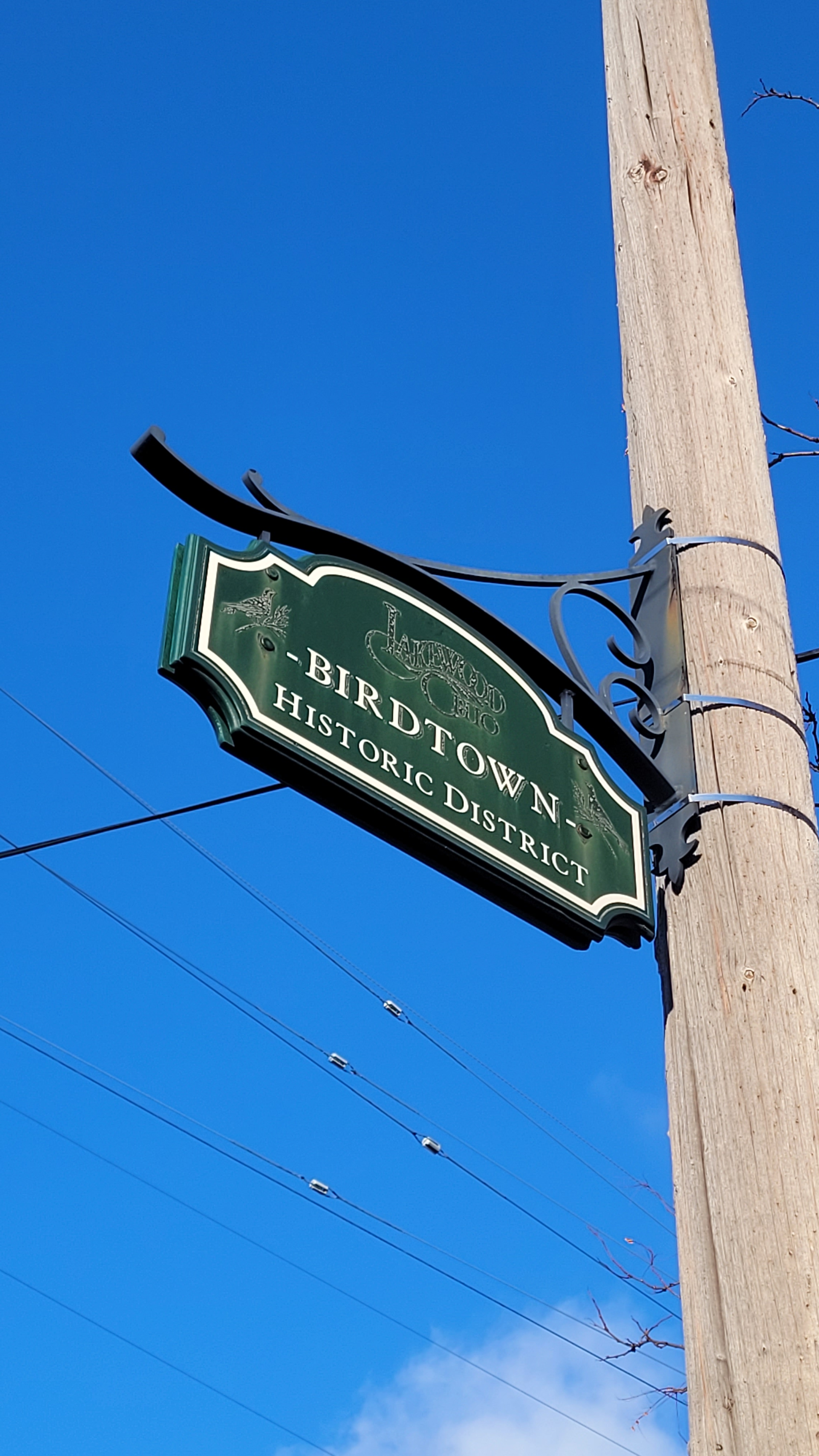

The names 'Bird's Nest' and 'Birdtown' were derived from several streets named for birds believed to be indigenous to the area including robin, plover, lark, and thrush among others.

The district was also referred to as "the village" by its original residents. A facet of Birdtown is evident when one walks along the tree-lined streets. Multiple uses of land and buildings for homes, stores, churches, domestic farm gardens, animals, and dairies provided a self-sustaining village within Lakewood. Several properties reflect the ingenuity of the early residents who built or added to their structures. The residents completed and maintained their properties meticulously, a feature which remains visible today.

== Composition ==
A visit to the area today reveals a very tidy neighborhood bounded by factories: NeoGraf Solutions at the 117th end and Lake Erie Screw Corporation on the west end (site of the former Templar Motor Corporation) on Halstead Avenue. Madison Avenue on the north and railroad tracks to the south enclose the community. Harrison Elementary School sits in the middle of the neighborhood which also is home to several ethnically connected churches, including North Coast Baptist Church (shown above) and schools. More than eight churches within the district served the Slovak, Polish, Ukrainian, and Carpatho-Rusyn people in the neighborhood. Two churches, both named Sts. Peter and Paul (one Orthodox and the other Lutheran, later renamed Grace Lutheran Church) illustrate the ethnic and religious varieties in the neighborhood. Immigrant families kept their language, worship, and traditions preserved through parish and school programs well into the 1900s. Birdtown is listed on the National Register of Historic Places. Today the neighborhood remains a hub for new immigrants in Lakewood, primarily from South Asia (Nepal, Bhutan, and Myanmar) and the post-Soviet space (Russia and Uzbekistan).
