= 1916 United States Senate election in Ohio =

- November 7, 1916
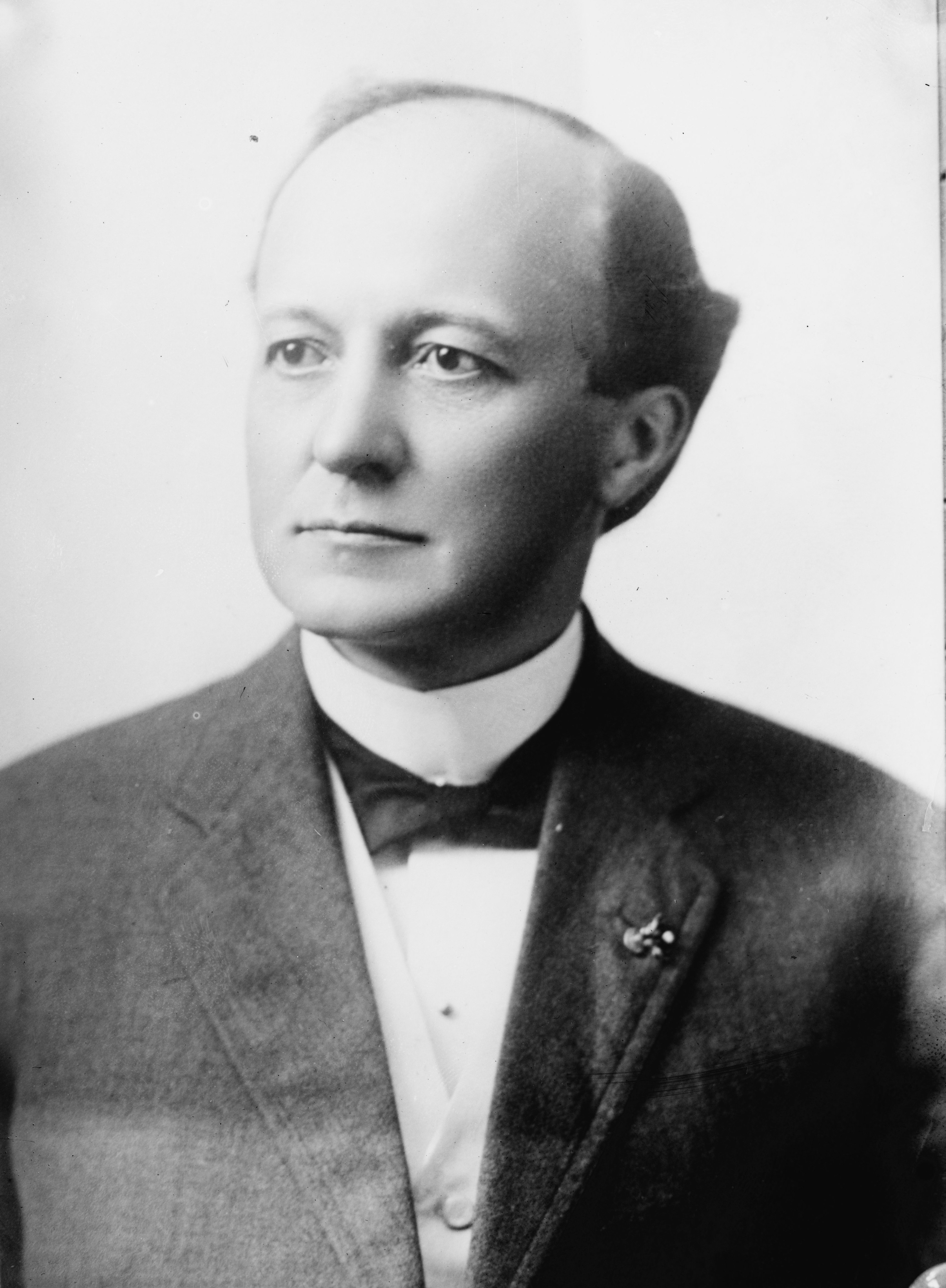

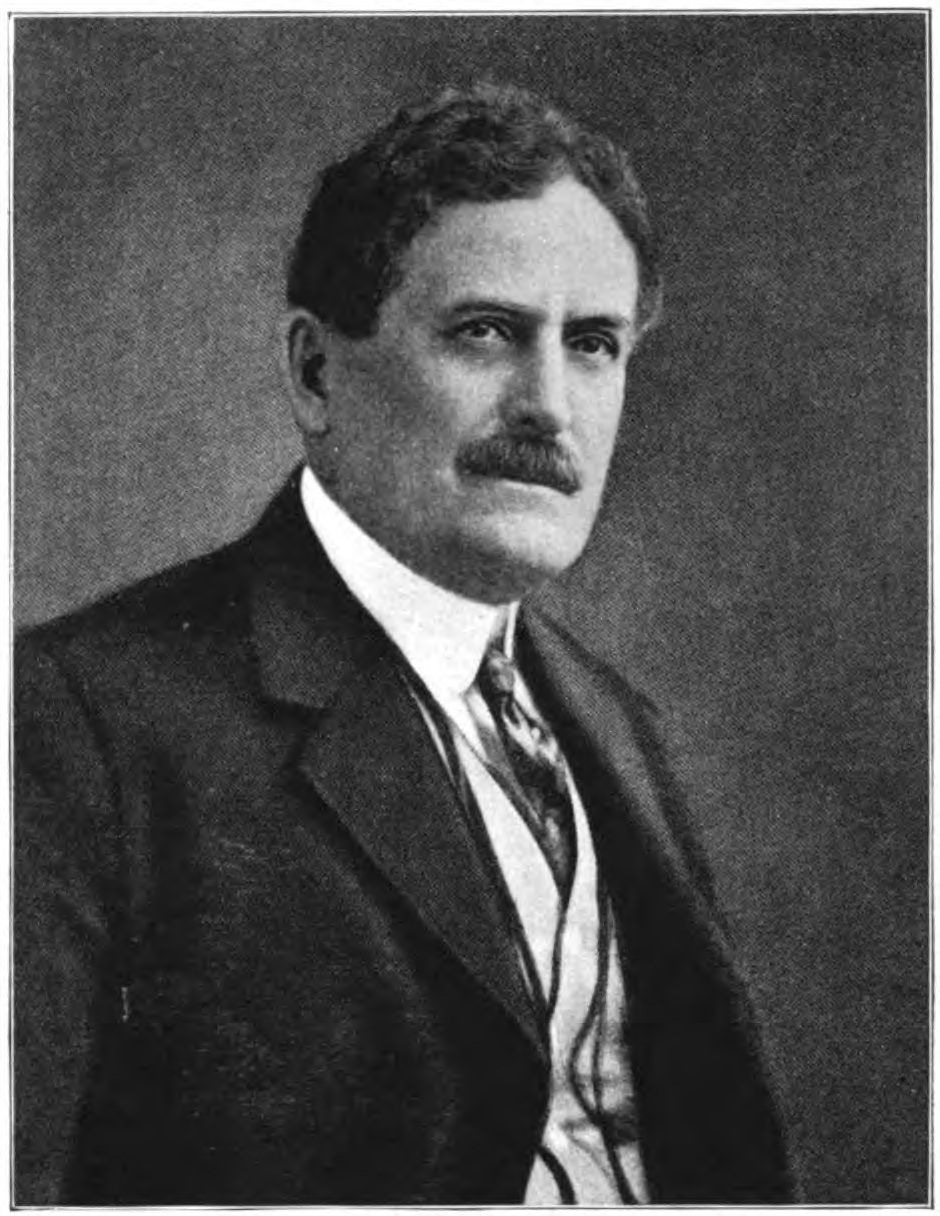
Nominee	Atlee Pomerene	Myron Herrick
Party	Democratic	Republican
Popular vote	571,488	535,391
Percentage	49.26%	46.15%
- County results Pomerene: 40–50% 50–60% 60–70% 70–80% Herrick: 40–50% 50–60%
U.S. senator before election
Atlee Pomerene
Democratic
Elected U.S. Senator
Atlee Pomerene
Democratic

The 1916 United States Senate election in Ohio took place on November 7, 1916. Incumbent Democratic Senator Atlee Pomerene was re-elected to a second term in office over Republican former Governor and Ambassador to France Myron Herrick.

== General election ==
=== Candidates ===
- Jacob Coxey, businessman, advocate for the unemployed, and perennial candidate (Independent)
- Myron Herrick, former U.S. Ambassador to France (1912–14) and Governor of Ohio (1904–06) (Republican)
- Atlee Pomerene, incumbent Senator since 1911 (Democratic)
- C. E. Ruthenberg (Socialist)
- Aaron S. Watkins, former president of Asbury College (Prohibition)

=== Results ===
1916 U.S. Senate election in Ohio
Party	Candidate	Votes	%
Democratic	Atlee Pomerene (incumbent)	571,488	49.26%
Republican	Myron Herrick	535,391	46.15%
Socialist	C. E. Ruthenberg	38,186	3.29%
Prohibition	Aaron S. Watkins	12,060	1.04%
Independent	Jacob Coxey	2,965	0.26%
Total votes		1,160,091	100.00%
Democratic hold			

== See also ==
- 1916 United States Senate elections
