= 1903 Ohio gubernatorial election =

- November 2, 1903
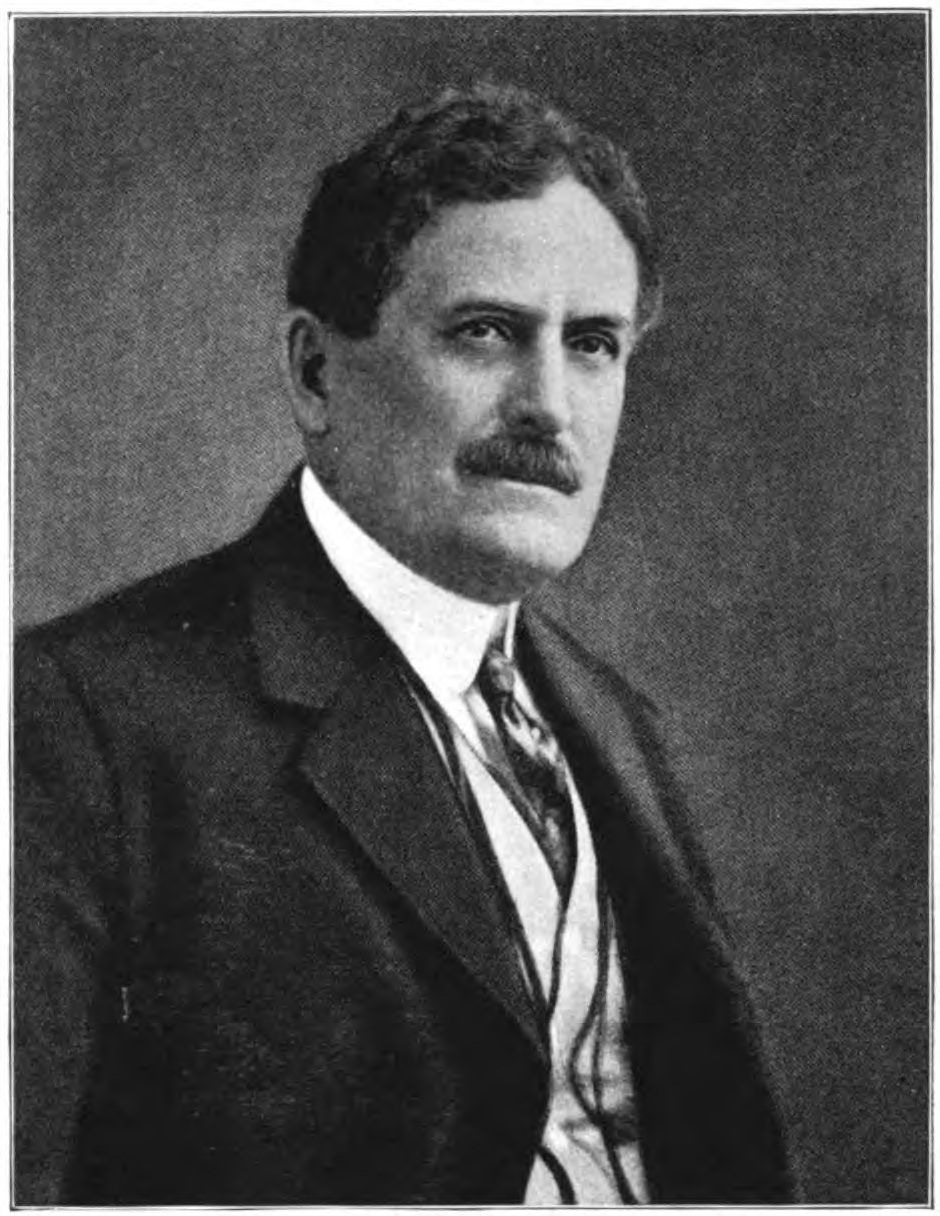

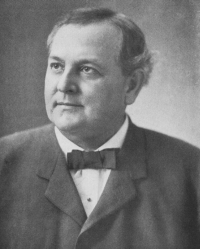
Nominee	Myron T. Herrick	Tom L. Johnson
Party	Republican	Democratic
Popular vote	475,560	361,748
Percentage	54.89%	41.76%
- County results Herrick: 40–50% 50–60% 60–70% 70–80% Johnson: 40–50% 50–60% 60–70%
Governor before election
George K. Nash
Republican
Elected Governor
Myron T. Herrick
Republican

The 1903 Ohio gubernatorial election was held on November 2, 1903. Republican nominee Myron T. Herrick defeated Democratic nominee Tom L. Johnson with 54.89% of the vote.

== General election ==
=== Candidates ===
Major party candidates

- Myron T. Herrick, Republican
- Tom L. Johnson, Democratic

Other candidates

- Nelson D. Creamer, Prohibition
- Isaac Cowan, Socialist
- John D. Goerke, Socialist Labor

=== Results ===
1903 Ohio gubernatorial election
Party	Candidate	Votes	%	±%
Republican	Myron T. Herrick	475,560	54.89%	
Democratic	Tom L. Johnson	361,748	41.76%	
Prohibition	Nelson D. Creamer	13,505	1.56%	
Socialist	Isaac Cowan	13,467	1.55%	
Socialist Labor	John D. Goerke	2,071	0.24%	
Majority		113,812		
Turnout				
Republican hold		Swing		
