= The Summit at Danbury =

Office building in Danbury, Connecticut

- Former names: Matrix Corporate Center, Union Carbide Corporate Center

General information
- Type: Corporate Offices, Conference & Banquet Center
- Location: Danbury, Connecticut
- Coordinates: 41.38196°N 73.53020°W
- Current tenants: Includes Cadenza Innovation, Department of Defense, General Motors, Attorney General, United Parcel Service, Chase Bank, Bank of America, US Bank, Scana Energy, Mastrack, Odyssey Logistics & Technology, Danbury Medical Group, Nuvance Health
- Construction started: 1980
- Completed: 1982
- Owner: Summit Development, LLC

Technical details
- Floor area: 2,100,000 square feet (200,000 m^{2})

Design and construction
- Architect: Kevin Roche
- Other designers: Emanuel Pisetzner

Other information
- Public transit: HARTransit: 3, 10

Website
- summitdanbury.com

The Summit at Danbury, formerly known as the Matrix Corporate Center and before that as the Union Carbide Corporate Center, is an architecturally unique building in Danbury, Connecticut, United States. It was constructed in 1982 as the headquarters of the Union Carbide chemical company, it is known for its unusual style and floorplan layout. The complex was designed by the late famous architect Kevin Roche who also designed other famous corporate headquarters.

== History ==
In 1976, Union Carbide announced that it intended to relocate from New York City to a location in Connecticut. After beginning construction in 1980, Union Carbide moved its approximately 3,000 staff members to the facility in 1983.

Following several corporate realignments, space was rented out to several different companies after a 1986 leaseback arrangement transferred ownership to a Florida company. This resulted in the facility being renamed the Corporate Center in 1992. Following the purchase of Union Carbide by The Dow Chemical Company in 2001, the Union Carbide staff was further reduced and more space sublet to other companies. In 2007 the building was sold to Grubb & Ellis for $80 million, less than half its original construction cost of $190 million. In 2009, the building was resold to Matrix Reality Group for $72.4 million. Matrix Realty Group, Inc., the new owner of the building, carried out several renovations, such as new granite in the Main Reception area and in other parts of the building, and renamed it the Matrix Corporate Center.

In 2018, Matrix was sold to Summit Development, a real estate developer based in Southport, Connecticut for $18 million. The complex was renamed to reflect the new ownership, and is being renovated to include luxury apartments in multiple wings. The existing office space is being renovated as well, and now includes new restaurants and an expanded gym/health center.

== Architecture ==
The move to the country was a trend away from densely crowded downtowns, like Manhattan. The layout of the building is unique in that the entire building rests on 5,000 pillars driven into the ground at heights of 5 to 40 feet (1.5 to 12.2 m), to avoid having to clear the land of obstacles. The structure as a whole consists of 15 interconnected buildings around a central core.

Additionally, the outer walls of the building face into the forest while the interior walls face a completely enclosed 2,500-space parking garage. The building was designed with several pods for the then divisions of Union Carbide that would occupy the facility. Further, it was set up so that each office was very close, sometimes only 10 feet (3 m), from its related parking spot and that employees would not need to exit the building to perform any functions.

In the center of the complex are several conference rooms, libraries, a cafeteria, and other support services. Each room in the 2.1 million-square-foot (195,000 m^{2}) complex, 1.3 million (117,000 m^{2}) of which is office space, has separate temperature controls and natural light through a series of translucent windows. The building sits on a 646-acre (261 ha) campus which has been subdivided over the years and now also hosts jogging trails and condominiums.

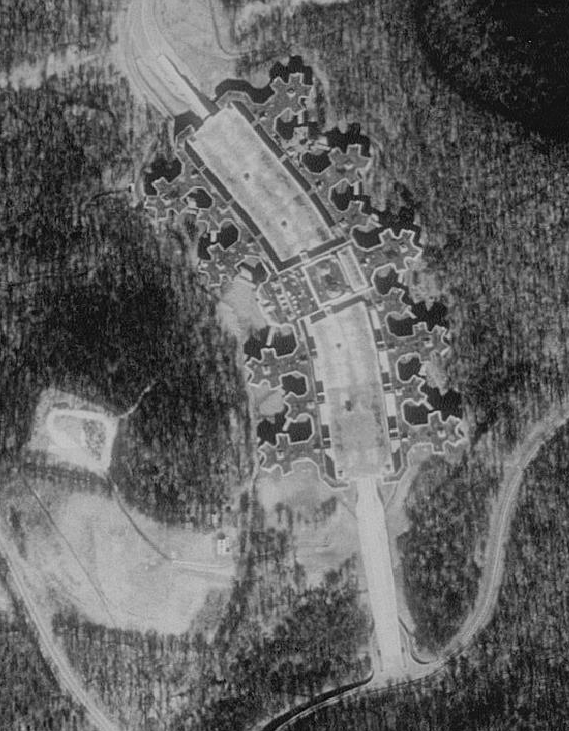
1991 aerial image (Union Carbide HQ at the time)

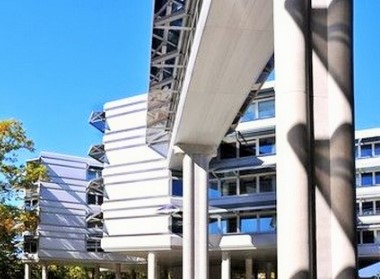
Current Photograph of The Summit at Danbury
