= Eveready East Africa =

Kenyan manufacturer and marketer

Eveready East Africa PLC
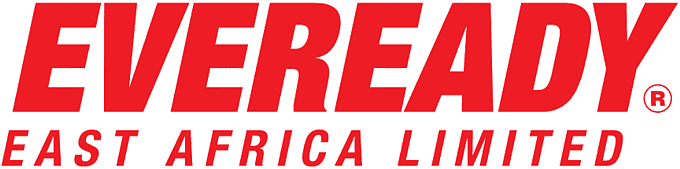
- Type: Public
- Traded as: KN: EVRD
- Industry: Electronics
- Founded: 6 March 1967; 59 years ago
- Headquarters: Nairobi, Kenya
- Area served: Africa
- Products: Batteries
- Website: Homepage

Eveready East Africa PLC is a Kenyan manufacturer and marketer of battery brands. It is headquartered in Nairobi, while maintaining a plant in Nakuru, Kenya.

== Overview ==
Eveready East Africa is an affiliate of the American Eveready Battery Company. In addition to manufacturing and marketing batteries, Eveready East Africa also distributes a wide range of products such as shaving razors, blades and accessories under brand names Schick and Clorox household products. Eveready East Africa is one of Africa's largest battery manufacturers, and is listed on the Nairobi Securities Exchange.

== History ==
Eveready East Africa was founded on 6 March 1967 as Union Carbide Kenya Limited, a subsidiary of US based Union Carbide Corporation. In the same year, ICDC and ICDC Investments (now Centum Investments) joined in as minority shareholders.

The firm's name was changed to Eveready Batteries Kenya Limited on 24 October 1986. Sameer Group acquired a majority stake in the company in 1988 through its wholly owned subsidiary East Africa Batteries.

2004 saw the company diversify into other consumer products, under the Schick brand, following the acquisition of Schick-Wilkinson Sword by Energizer Holdings. In the same year, the company name was changed to its current name of Eveready East Africa.

The shares of Eveready East Africa were listed on the Nairobi Securities Exchange in 2006 through an initial public offering, which was over subscribed by 733%.

== Member companies ==
Other than battery manufacturing, Eveready East Africa has invested in real estate through its wholly owned subsidiary, Flamingo Properties. Flamingo Properties is based in Kenya, and in turn has a subsidiary, Flamingo Properties Uganda Limited, which is domiciled in Kampala, Uganda.

== Shareholding ==
The shares of Eveready East Africa are publicly listed on the NSE, where it trades under the symbol EVRD. As of September 2015, the ten largest shareholders in the Group's stock are depicted in the table below:

Eveready East Africa PLC stock ownership
Rank	Name of owner	Percentage ownership
1	East Africa Batteries Limited	58.64
2	Industrial & Commercial Development Corporation	29.22
3	Other	12.14
	Total	100.00
