= Matrix Realty Group, Inc. =

- Industry: Real estate
- Founded: 1993
- Founder: Richard Nieto
- Headquarters: Port Jefferson, New York, United States
- Area served: United States

Matrix Realty Group, Inc. is an American real estate company based in Port Jefferson, New York, United States. Glen Nelson was the CEO of the privately held real estate investment-development firm and management company which has holdings throughout the United States. The company owns and manages over 6 million square feet of Class A commercial office buildings, 10,000 multi-family residential units, and other commercial properties.

== Ownership and history ==
The Matrix Realty Group was founded in 1993 by Richard Nieto, and after 4 years, the late Glen Nelson joined as managing partner. Nieto is responsible for managing all aspects of the Matrix Realty Group. Since 1993, he has overseen the acquisition, financing, leasing, property management, redevelopment, and sale of over 10 million square feet of real estate throughout the United States. Richard Nieto's focus was on the purchase of defaulted notes.

One of Matrix's most recent projects includes a $40M housing, office project planned for Grant Deneau Tower in downtown Dayton.

On December 20, 2015, Nelson died after he lost control of his car while driving along East Broadway in Port Jefferson, New York. Enrico Scarda was named acting CEO after the sudden loss.

== Properties ==
- Matrix Corporate Park Hauppauge/Islandia Long Island, NY – 400,000 sq/ft
- Matrix Corporate Center at Danbury, CT - 1.2 million square-foot office complex
- Matrix MHC Homes - Various locations throughout Michigan and Alabama

== Food and dining businesses ==
Restaurant related properties include Gasho of Japan in Hauppauge and Central Valley, New York, and The Matrix Conference and Banquet Center at the Danbury Corporate Center facility in Connecticut.
