= Union Carbide India Limited =

Indian chemical company

- Founded: 1934
- Fate: Renamed Eveready Industries India in 1994
- Headquarters: India
- Products: Batteries; Carbon products; Welding equipment; Plastics; Industrial chemicals; Pesticides; Marine products; Bakelite
- Number of employees: 9,000 (1994)

Union Carbide India Limited (UCIL) was a chemical company founded in 1934. At the time of its rebranding in 1994, UCIL employed 9,000 people. UCIL was 50.9% owned by Union Carbide and Carbon Corporation (UCC) located in the United States and 49.1% by Indian investors, including the Government of India and government-controlled banks.

UCIL produced batteries, carbon products, welding equipment, plastics, industrial chemicals, pesticides and marine products. In 1984, a gas leak occurred at a UCIL facility located in Bhopal, Madhya Pradesh, that was responsible for manufacturing various chemical products, primarily pesticides. The incident killed thousands of people, and harmed hundreds of thousands more by causing chronic illnesses. At the time of the disaster, UCIL was ranked twenty-first in size among companies operating in India. It had revenues of ₹2 billion (then equivalent to US$170 million).

The formation of the pesticides and herbicides that were produced by Union Carbide was from carbaryl which is used as a base chemical in order to react with methyl isocyanate and alpha naphthol. In 1970, there was an issue with the methyl isocyanate unit being built (MIC) in Bhopal. The issue was due to the location of the unit which was nearby a railroad station and a heavily populated area.

== Bhopal gas tragedy ==
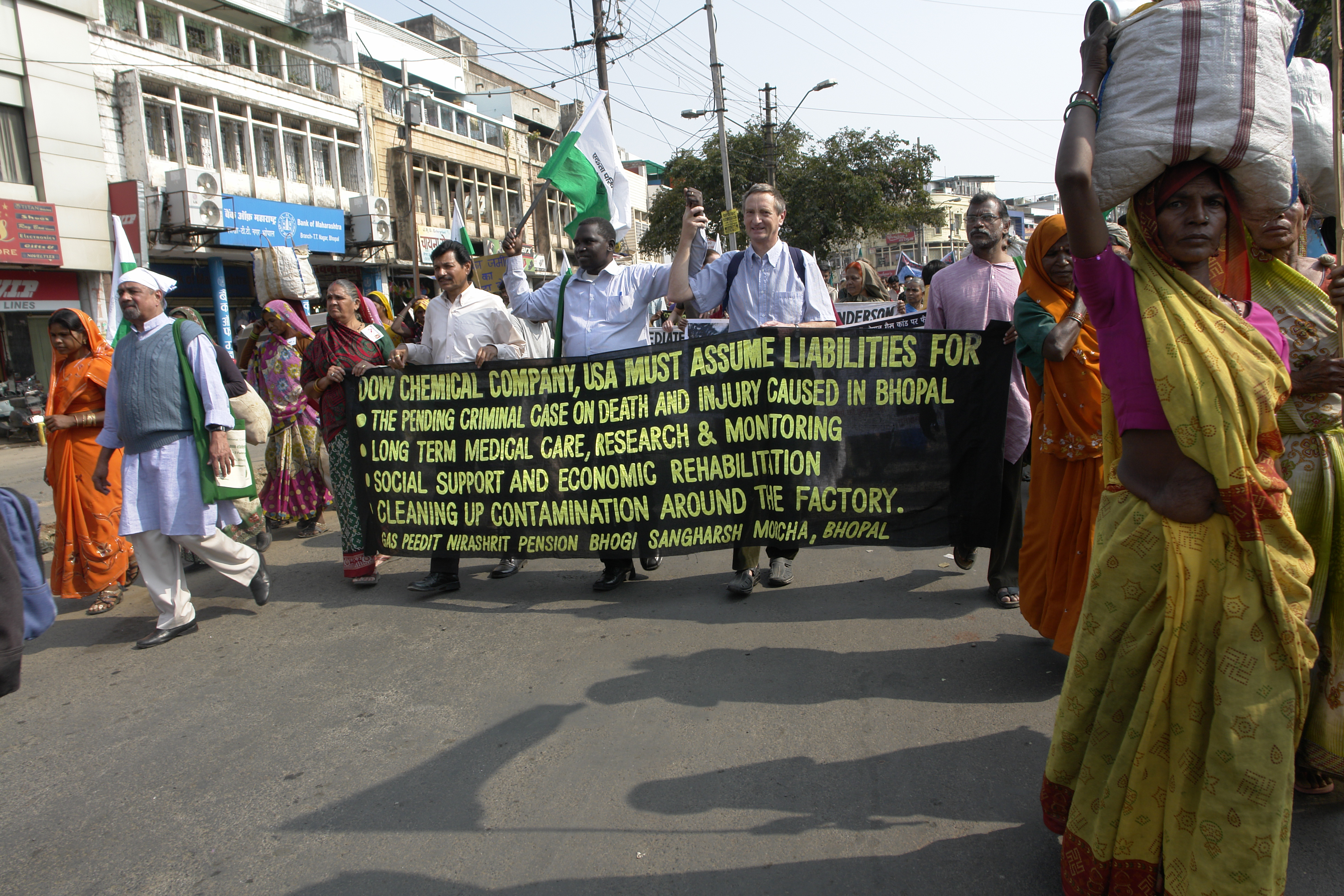
Protest in Bhopal, India, 2010

A gas leak happened between the nights of 2 and 3 December 1984 in Bhopal. This gas leak killed thousands of people. Some survivors developed cancer and other health related impairments.

A case was filed against the company which consisted of multiple players and negotiations. The Indian government also filed a lawsuit right after the parentis-patriae act passed. This act gave the victims of this tragedy representation. This led the mobilization of various victims which started the development of different activist organizations. Bhopal registered a claim of $10 billion, based on United States injustice claim standards. The Indian government claim of $3.3 billion was settled for $470 million. In 1994, UCC sold its entire stake in UCIL to Mcleod Russel India Limited of Calcutta, which renamed the company Eveready Industries India Limited. The proceeds from the UCIL sale (US$90 million) were placed in a trust to fund a hospital in Bhopal to care for victims of the tragedy.

In February 1989, the Supreme Court of India directed UCC and UCIL to pay $470 million to settle all claims arising from the tragedy. The government, UCC and UCIL agreed with the ruling, and the two companies paid the settlement on 24 February.
