= Eveready Battery Company =

American electric battery manufacturer

Eveready Battery Company, Inc.
- Formerly: American Electrical Novelty and Manufacturing Company (1896–1905); The American Ever Ready Company (1905–1986)
- Type: Subsidiary
- Industry: Electronics
- Founded: 1896; 130 years ago
- Founder: Conrad Hubert
- Headquarters: St. Louis, Missouri, U.S.
- Key people: Alan Hoskins (CEO)
- Products: Batteries, flashlights
- Brands: Eveready
- Parent: National Carbon Company (1914–17); Union Carbide (1917–86); Ralston Purina (1986–2000); Energizer Holdings (2000–present)
- Subsidiaries: Eveready East Africa (1967)
- Website: eveready.com

Eveready Battery Company, Inc. is an American manufacturer of electric battery brands Eveready and Energizer, owned by Energizer Holdings. Its headquarters are located in St. Louis, Missouri.

The predecessor company began in 1896 in New York and was renamed in 1905. Today, the company makes batteries in the United States and China and has production facilities around the world.

== History ==
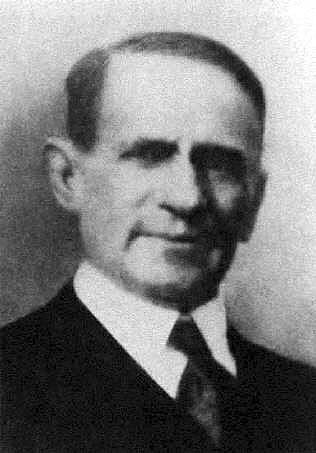
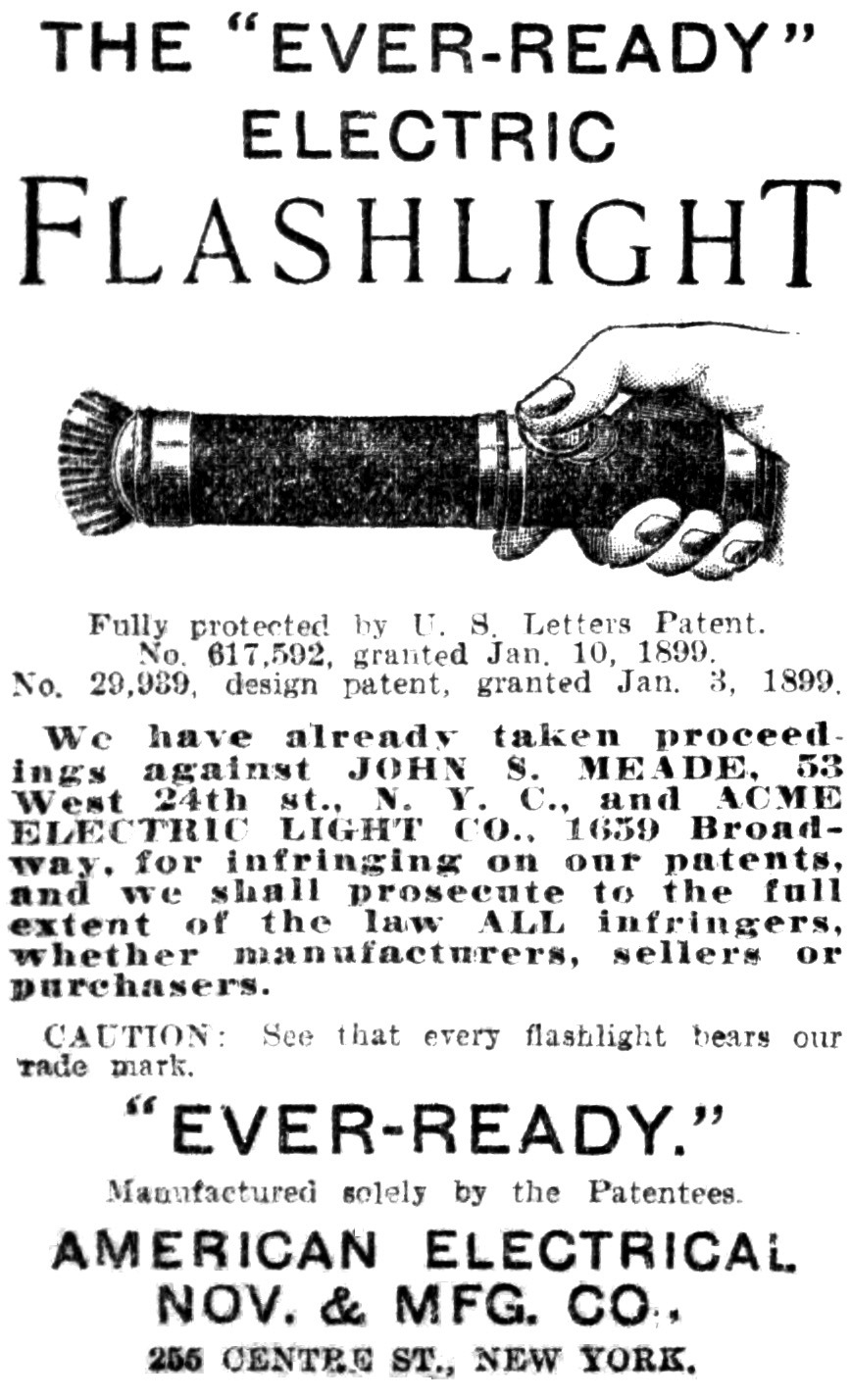
Left: Conrad Herbert, founder of Eveready;
Right: January 1899 Ever-Ready flashlight ad mentioning the proceedings against the alleged patent-infringing rival companies

In 1896, Jewish immigrant from Russia, Conrad Hubert, founded the American Electrical Novelty and Manufacturing Company to market battery powered devices. On January 10, 1899, the company obtained U.S. Patent No. 617,592 (filed March 12, 1898) from David Misell, an inventor. This "electric device" designed by Misell was powered by "D" batteries laid front-to-back in a paper tube with the light bulb and a rough brass reflector at the end. Misell, the inventor of the tubular hand-held "electric device" (flashlight), assigned his invention over to Hubert's company. The flashlight and batteries were marketed using the "Ever Ready" trademark.

In 1905, Hubert changed the name of the company to The American Ever Ready Company. In 1906 the British Ever Ready Electrical Company (BEREC) was formed for export of batteries; it became independent in 1914. In 1907, Ever Ready introduced the AA dry cell, and in 1911 it developed the AAA dry cell.

In 1914, The American Ever Ready Company became part of National Carbon Company. Hubert stayed on as the president. The trademark was shortened to Eveready. Under National Carbon, the company continued to market various tubular flashlights, flask-shaped pocket lights, fountainpen flashlights, lighted clocks, lanterns, electric candles, cap and lapel lights, search lights, pistol lights, gas and range lighters, and tungsten batteries. In 1917, National Carbon Company merged with Union Carbide to form the Union Carbide and Carbon Company. From 1917 until 1921, Eveready used the trademark "DAYLO" for their flashlights and on their batteries. Into the 1930s, it sold "A", "B", and "C" radio batteries, Columbia Dry Batteries, and flashlight batteries. Radio batteries were sold under the Layerbilt name.

In 1937, a South African operation was established in Port Elizabeth. By 1949, BEREC acquired the concern.

In 1957, employees Lewis Urry, Paul Marsal, and Karl Kordesch invented a long-lasting alkaline battery while working for Union Carbide's Cleveland plant. The company did not aggressively market the invention, however, and instead continued to market the zinc–carbon battery. As a result, the company lost significant market share to Duracell.

Union Carbide Kenya Limited., based in Kenya, was established in 1967 to manufacturer and market Eveready batteries in Africa. It was renamed to Eveready Batteries Kenya Limited in 1986 and to Eveready East Africa Limited in 2004.

Prior to March 1, 1980, the company's alkaline battery had been called the Eveready Alkaline Battery (1959–1968), Eveready Alkaline Energizer (1968–1974) and Eveready Alkaline Power Cell (1974–February 29, 1980). On March 1, 1980, it was rebadged under its current name, Energizer.

In 1986, Union Carbide sold its Battery Products Division to Ralston Purina for $1.4 billion. After the transfer, the division was named Eveready Battery Company, Inc., becoming a wholly owned subsidiary of Ralston Purina. By the end of 1987, Eveready held 58-60% percent market share, but that number had fallen to 40-45% by 1989 thanks to competition from Duracell. In December 1988, Eveready's European unit acquired Cofinea, a French company that made Wonder and Mazda batteries.

Eveready announced its first lithium AA battery in 1988 and began selling it in December 1992. The company introduced its first mercury-free Battery in 1990.

In 1992, it bought the British Ever Ready Electrical Company (manufacturer of Gold Seal and Silver Seal batteries) from Hanson Trust, bringing its former subsidiary back under common ownership. Hanson retained its South African division at the time but ultimately sold it to Duracell in 1996.

By December 1998, Eveready's market share had fallen to 30% against Duracell's 50%. In June 1999, Ralston Purina announced it would spin off the Eveready business. By September, it was announced that Eveready would sell its rechargeable battery division, though it retained a minority stake.

Ralston completed its spin off Eveready in April 2000. The business unit was renamed Energizer Holdings, Inc., with Eveready Battery Company, Inc continuing as a subsidiary.

== Facilities ==
The company's initial factory opened in the 1890s and was located near Edgewater Park in Cleveland, Ohio. The manufacturing plant was closed in 1978 and all operations shut down in 1997. The site was put up for sale in 1999 and later turned into the Battery Park housing development.

Eveready inherited its Fremont, Ohio plant when National Carbon Company acquired the company in 1914. The facility produced hearing aid batteries, aluminum-air batteries, C and D zinc-carbon batteries, and six-inch dry cell batteries at various times. It was closed in March 1998 following the decline in demand for zinc-carbon batteries.

Eveready opened a plant in Bennington, Vermont in 1942 and a facility in St. Albans in 1947. The St. Albans plant closed in 2013. After nearly 80 years of operation, it was announced in October 2019 that the Bennington facility would close. Production operations moved to a new facility in Portage, Wisconsin.

In 1967, Union Carbide opened an electrolytic manganese dioxide plant in Marietta, Ohio. Three ferromanganese-alloy furnace departments were sold in 1981. A fire in April 1987 kept the facility closed for over a year.

In 1971, Eveready opened a facility in Maryville, Missouri. It was underwent five expansions from 1973 to 1997 before ultimately closing in 2013 due to a drop in demand of disposable batteries.

The company also maintained facilities in Asheboro, North Carolina; Marietta, Ohio; and Westlake, Ohio. The majority of batteries are made in China. There are also numerous production facilities outside the US.

== Advertising ==
In the 1920s, the company sponsored The Eveready Hour on radio.

In 1941, after the United States entered World War II, the slogan changed to "Change your batteries, get a nickel!" to encourage economic growth.

Beginning in 1977, actor Robert Conrad was the spokesman for Eveready Alkaline Power Cells, in which he compared his tough physique to the performance of the battery placed on his shoulder, and daring someone to knock it off.

In the early 1980s, it utilized the slogan, "Energized, for life!", showing people using Energizers in everyday situations.

In 1985, the company highlighted an advertising campaign best known for Mary Lou Retton averring: "It's supercharged!"

In the late 1980s, there was an Australian advertising campaign featuring Mark 'Jacko' Jackson and his pitch line "Energizer! It'll surprise you! Oi!".

Since 1988, the well-known Energizer Bunny has been featured in its television ads. The bunny was based on the similar Duracell Bunny. Initially, ads had the Energizer Bunny interrupting what seemed like other brands' commercials. Later, the bunny would appear in competition with inferior rival battery Supervolt, which was based on Duracell. In 1991, it made the jump to print advertising. Outside the United States and Canada, the company uses an anthropomorphic AA battery named Mr. Energizer as its mascot.

Both the Eveready and Energizer marks are used under license by auto parts magnate Pep Boys for their in-house car batteries.

== Gallery ==
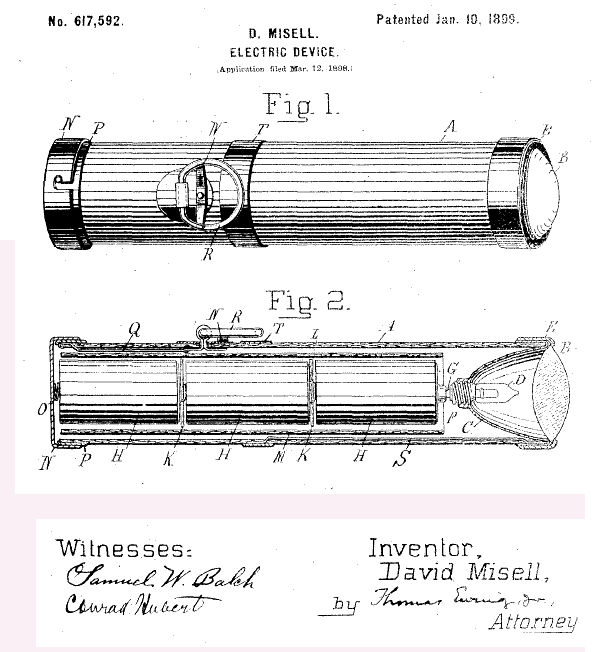
Misell's Patent 617,592

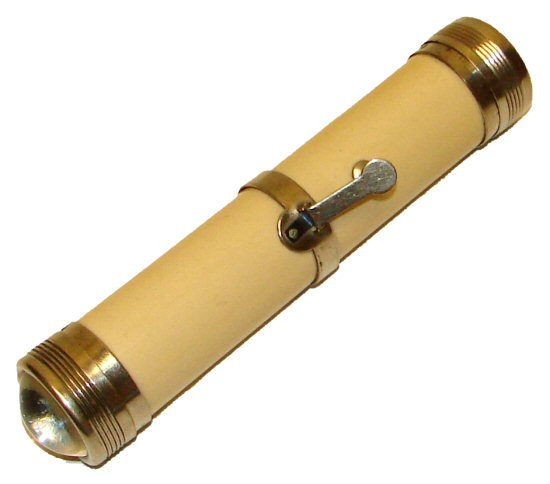
1899 Eveready flashlight

"9 Lives" logo, used in various forms since the 1940s

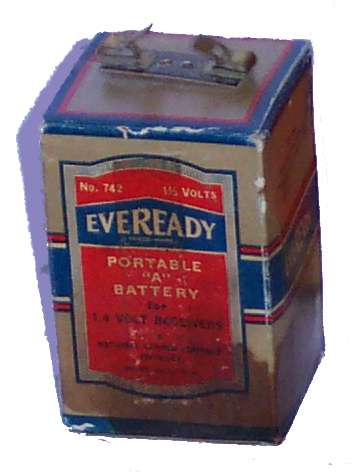
Eveready #742 1½ volt "A" battery with Fahnestock clip terminals for vacuum tube radios (1920s logo)

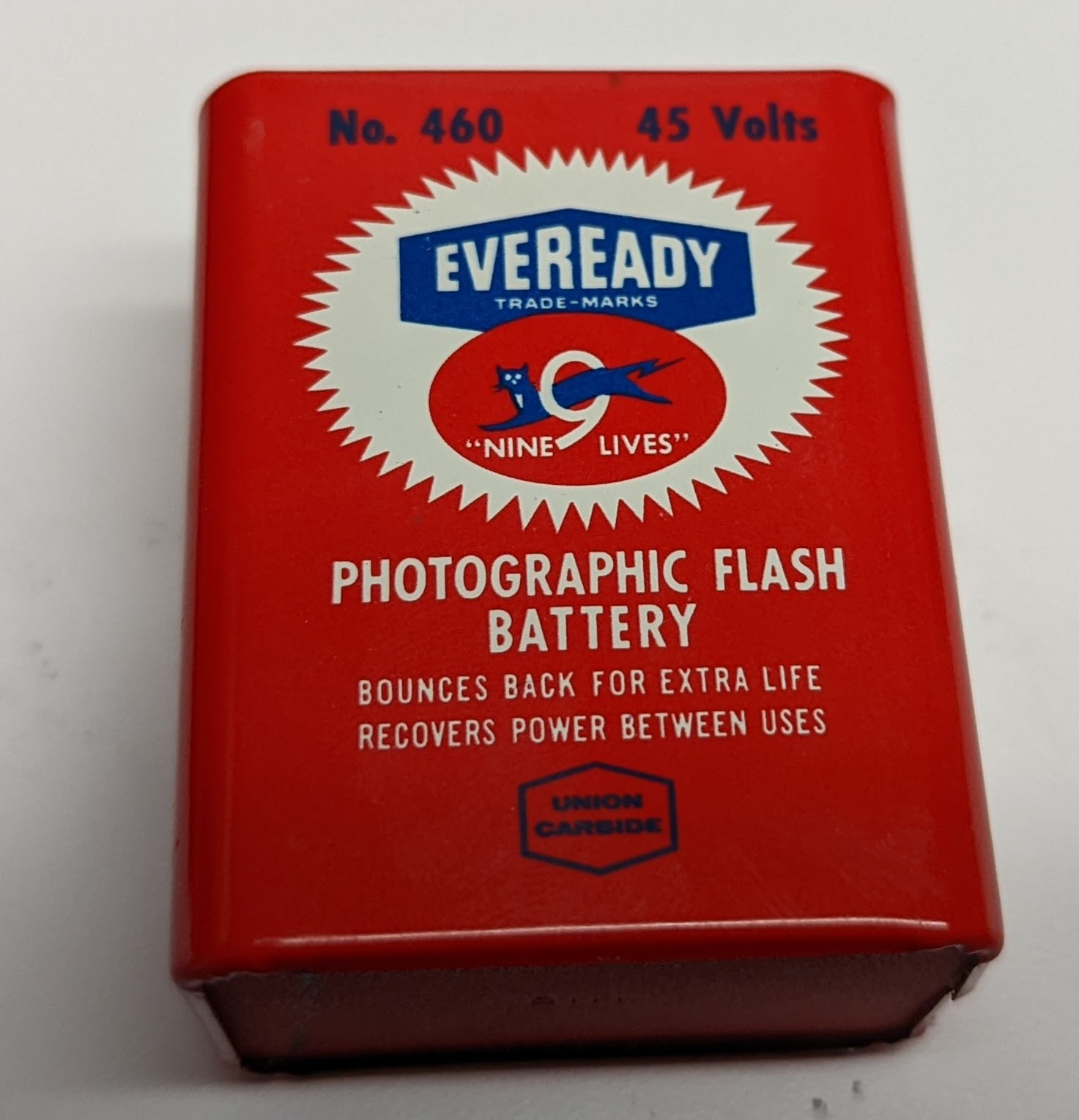
Eveready #460 battery, 45 Volts

== See also ==
- Eveready East Africa
- Eveready Industries India
- Battery holder
