= National Carbon Company =

American manufacturer of batteries and lighting products

The National Carbon Company was a dominant American manufacturer of batteries and lighting products in the early 20th century. It was the first company to successfully manufacture and distribute sealed dry cell batteries on a large scale.

It was founded in 1886 in Cleveland, Ohio, by Washington H. Lawrence, a former Brush Electric Company executive; banker and Cleveland politician Myron T. Herrick; James Parmelee; and Webb Hayes, son of U.S. President Rutherford B. Hayes. In 1889, it absorbed 10 other companies, subsuming "the entire active carbon industry of the United States and three-quarters of the carbon industry of the world." In 1906, it invested in what became the Eveready Battery Company, which it purchased in 1914.

Three years later, National Carbon was acquired by Union Carbide.

== History ==
In 1881, W. H. Boulton and Willis U. Masters founded the Boulton Carbon Company to make carbon points ("carbons") for arc lighting. Formally incorporated in 1883, it was taken over in 1886 by a group of investors led by Washington H. Lawrence, who reorganized the company as the National Carbon Company.

In 1894, the company began marketing Leclanché wet cells.

Menawhile, E. M. Jewett, who was working in the company's Lakewood plant on the west side of Cleveland under the direction of George Little, became interested in dry cells. In his free time, Jewett conducted experiments in the laboratory. He developed a paper-lined, 1.5-volt cylindrical dry cell which he showed to Lawrence, who gave Jewett and Little approval to begin manufacturing dry cells. The trademark "Columbia" was proposed by Nelson C. Cotabish, an NCC sales manager. In 1896, the company marketed the first battery intended for widespread consumer use: the sealed, six-inch, 1.5-volt Columbia. NCC was the first company to successfully manufacture and distribute sealed dry cell batteries on a large scale. The company introduced the first D-cell battery in 1898.

In 1899, the National Carbon Company merged with 10 other companies, subsuming "the entire active carbon industry of the United States and three-quarters of the carbon industry of the world". The firm "incorporated under New Jersey laws January 16, 1899 as a consolidation of the following companies engaged in the manufacture of lighting carbons, carbon brushes for generators and motors, carbon batteries, carbon diaphragms and back plates for telephones, carbons for electrolytic purposes and kindred products."

- American Carbon Company, Noblesville, Indiana
- Brush Carbon Works, Cleveland
- Faraday Carbon Company, Jeannette, Pennsylvania
- Globe Carbon Company, Ravenna, Ohio
- National Carbon Company, Cleveland
- Partridge Carbon Company, Sandusky, Ohio
- Phoenix Carbon & Manufacturing Company, St. Louis, Missouri
- Solar Carbon & Manufacturing Company, Pittsburgh
- The Standard Carbon Company, Cleveland
- Thomson-Houston Carbon Company, Fremont, Ohio
- The Washington Carbon Company, Pittsburgh

In 1906, National Carbon Company, which had been supplying Conrad Hubert's American Electrical Novelty & Manufacturing Company (maker of Ever Ready flashlights and batteries) with materials for batteries, bought half interest in the company for $200,000. The name was changed to The American Ever Ready Company and the trademark was shortened to Eveready. In 1914, National Carbon Company absorbed The American Ever Ready Company, forming a manufacturer that produced lighting products as wells as batteries.

=== Post-acquisition ===
In 1917, National Carbon Company was acquired by Union Carbide in a deal that also absorbed the Prest-O-lite Company and the Linde Air Products Company.

In 1940, the company supplied highly purified carbon for the role as nuclear graphite in nuclear fission experiments carried out by Enrico Fermi and Leo Szilard.

Since its absorption, the company has been called the Carbon Products Division of Union Carbide, the UCAR Carbon Company, and UCAR International. In 2002, it was renamed GrafTech International.

Over the years, various companies have been spun off from the former National Carbon Company, including KEMET Laboratories (capacitor technologies), Cytec Industries' Engineered Materials group (carbon fiber products), Energizer Holdings (batteries), and National Specialty Products (carbon and graphite specialty products). A division spun off in 2017, NeoGraf Solutions, retains the original National Carbon factory in Lakewood, Ohio.

== Legacy ==
The American Chemical Society designated the development of the Columbia dry cell battery as a National Historic Chemical Landmark on September 27, 2005. The commemorative plaques at Energizer in Cleveland and at Energizer headquarters in St. Louis read:

"In 1896 the National Carbon Company (corporate predecessor of Energizer) developed the six-inch, 1.5 volt Columbia battery, the first sealed dry cell successfully manufactured for the mass market. The Columbia, a carbon-zinc battery with an acidic electrolyte, was a significant improvement over previous batteries, meeting consumer demand for a maintenance-free, durable, no-spill, inexpensive electrochemical power source. Finding immediate use in the rapidly expanding telephone and automobile industries, the Columbia launched the modern battery industry by serving as the basis for all dry cells for the next sixty years."
