= James Parmelee =

American financier

James Parmelee (1855-1931) was a Cleveland financier.

In 1886, he co-founded the National Carbon Company as part of a group that included Webb C. Hayes, the son of U.S. president Rutherford B. Hayes. The company figured prominently in the history of the battery.

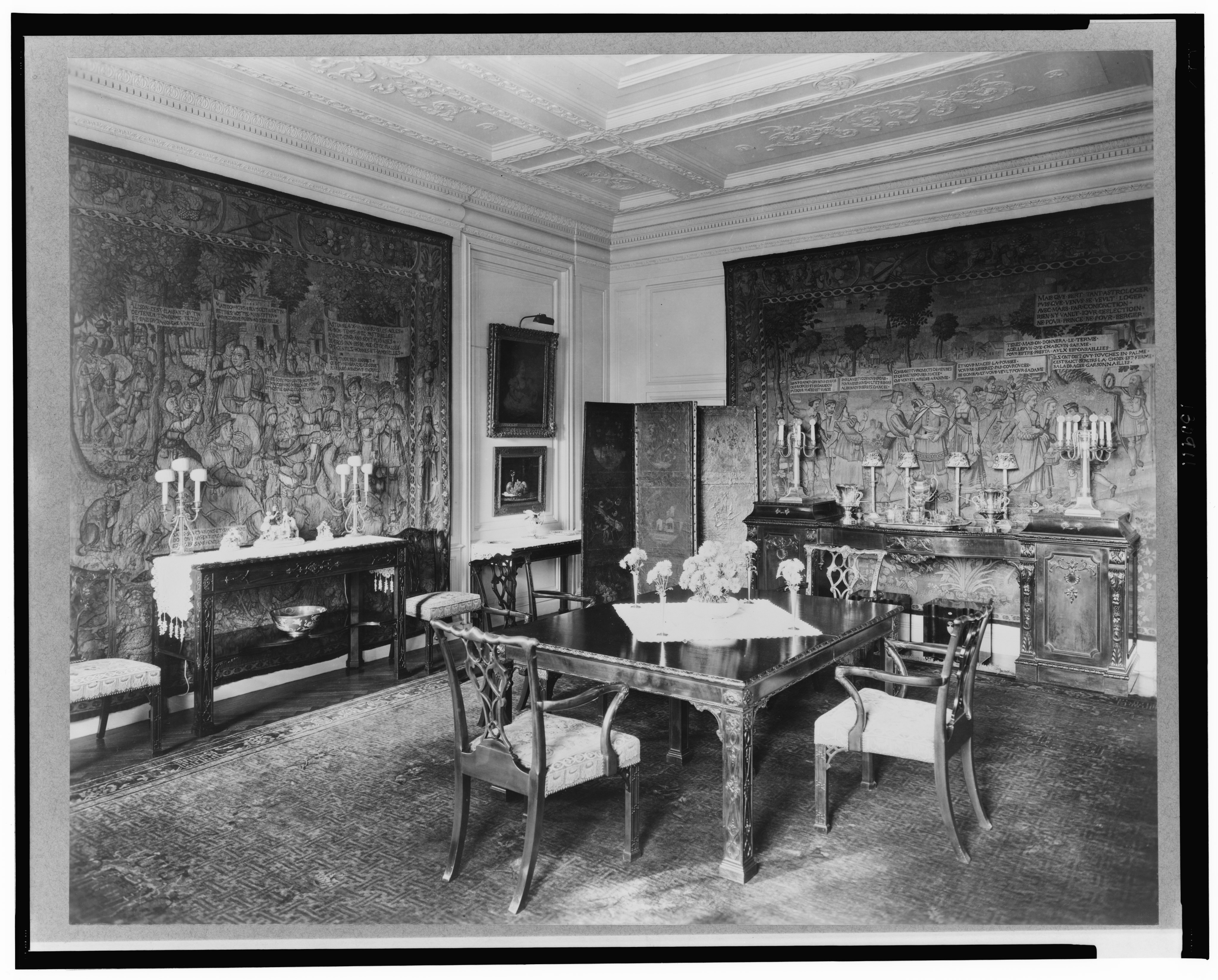
"The Causeway" interior

Parmelee was also the fourth president of the Cleveland General Electric Company.

He and his wife Alice Maury Parmelee were benefactors of the Washington National Cathedral and Smithsonian Institution in Washington, D.C., as well as Ohio charities. He was one of the founders of a predecessor institution of Case Western Reserve University. Their Cleveland house, on what was then called Millionaires Row (Euclid Avenue), no longer exists. Their Washington, D.C., home, which they called "the Causeway", was renamed "Tregaron" by a successor owner, listed on the National Register of Historic Places, and after some controversy remains fairly intact.
