= Union Carbide =

American chemical company

Union Carbide Corporation
- Type: Subsidiary
- Traded as: NYSE: UCC (until 2001); DJIA component (until 1999); S&P 500 component (until 2001)
- Industry: Chemicals
- Founded: 1917; 109 years ago
- Founder: John Motley Morehead III
- Headquarters: Seadrift, Texas, U.S.
- Key people: Richard Wells (CEO & president)
- Products: Bulk chemicals; Ethylene; Ethylene derivatives
- Revenue: ▼US$4.377 billion (2019)
- Operating income: ▼US$691 million (2019)
- Net income: ▼US$523 million (2019)
- Total assets: ▼US$5.278 billion (2019)
- Total equity: ▼US$0.925 billion (2019)
- Parent: Dow Chemical Company
- Website: unioncarbide.com

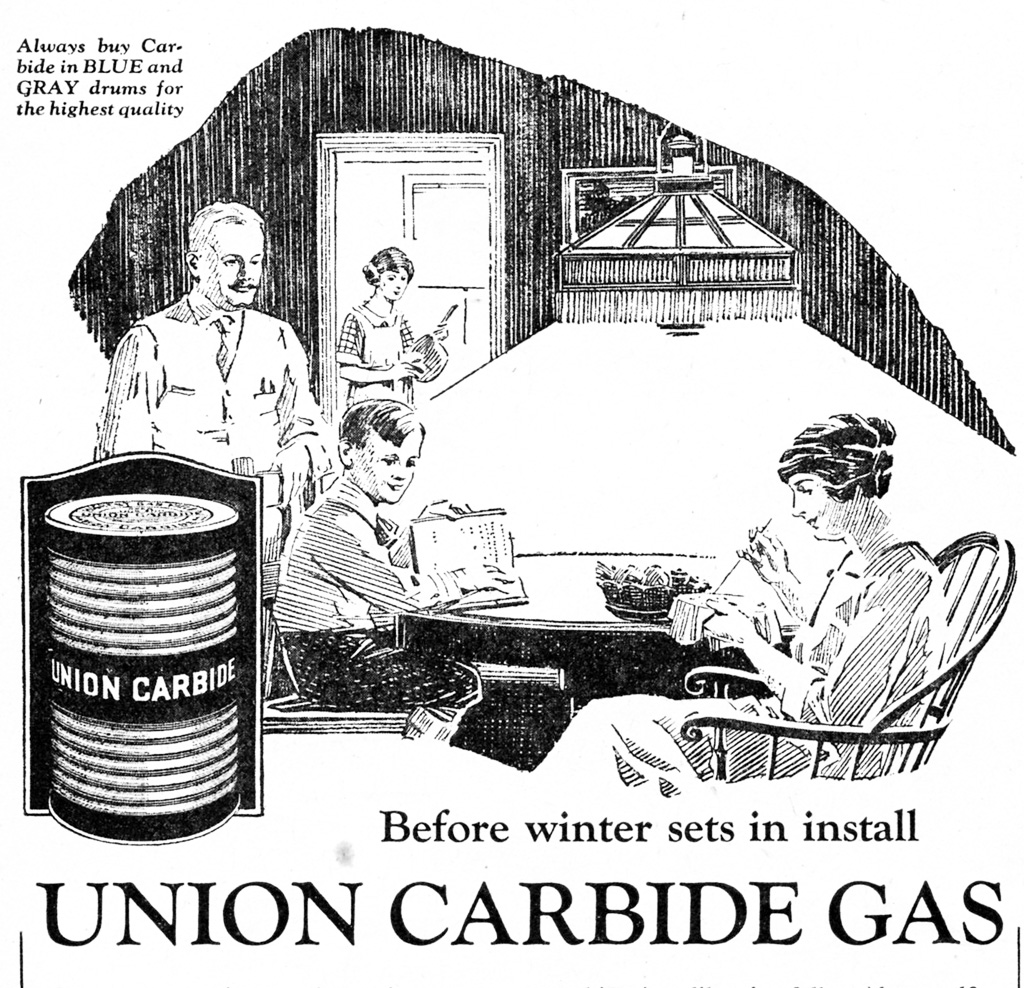
A 1922 advertisement for Union Carbide gas lighting. Electric lighting was not yet common in many rural areas of the United States.

Union Carbide Corporation (UCC) is an American chemical company headquartered in Seadrift, Texas. It has been a wholly owned subsidiary of Dow Chemical Company since 2001. Union Carbide produces chemicals and polymers that undergo one or more further conversions by customers before reaching consumers. Some are high-volume commodities and others are specialty products. Markets served include paints and coatings, packaging, wire and cable, household products, personal care, pharmaceuticals, automotive, textiles, agriculture, and oil and gas. The company is a former component of the Dow Jones Industrial Average.

Founded in 1917 as the Union Carbide and Carbon Corporation, from a merger with National Carbon Company, the company's researchers developed an economical way to make ethylene from natural gas liquids, such as ethane and propane, spurring on the modern petrochemical industry. The company divested consumer products businesses Eveready and Energizer batteries, Glad bags and wraps, Simoniz car wax and Prestone antifreeze. The company divested other businesses before being acquired by Dow including electronic chemicals, polyurethane intermediates, industrial gases (Linde) and carbon products.

== History ==
The Union Carbide and Carbon Corporation was formed on November 1, 1917. It resulted from a merger of the Union Carbide Company (founded in 1898), the National Carbon Company (founded in 1886), Linde Air Products Company (a Buffalo-based supplier of liquid oxygen that was confiscated from Gesellschaft für Linde's Eismaschinen AG under the Trading with the Enemy Act of 1917), and the Prest-O-Lite company, which manufactured calcium carbide in Indianapolis. In 1920, the company set up a chemicals division which manufactured ethylene glycol for use as automotive antifreeze. The company continued to acquire related chemical producers, including the Bakelite Corporation in 1939. The company changed its name to "Union Carbide Corporation" in 1957 and was often referred to as Carbide. It operated Oak Ridge National Laboratory from 1947 to 1984.

During the Cold War, the company was active in the field of rocket propulsion research and development for aerospace and guided missile applications, particularly in the field of chemicals and plastics, solid rocket motors, and storable liquid fuels. R&D and engineering were conducted at the Technical Center in South Charleston, West Virginia. The Aerospace Materials Department was part of the company's Carbon Products Division.

Ucar batteries was Carbide's industrial and consumer zinc chloride battery business. The business, including Eveready and Energizer alkaline batteries, was sold to Ralston Purina in 1986, following a hostile takeover attempt.

After the Bhopal disaster in 1984, Union Carbide was the subject of repeated takeover attempts. In order to pay off its debt, Carbide sold many of its most familiar brands such as Glad Trashbags and Eveready Batteries. Dow Chemical announced the purchase of Carbide in 1999 for $8.89 billion in stock. The deal was consummated in 2001 and valued at $11.6 billion. Carbide became a wholly owned subsidiary of Dow Chemical on February 6, 2001.

== Hawks Nest Tunnel disaster ==
The Hawks Nest Tunnel disaster took place between 1927 and 1932 in a West Virginia tunnel project led by Union Carbide. During the construction of the tunnel, workers found the mineral silica and were asked to mine it for use in electroprocessing steel. The workers were not given masks or breathing equipment to use while mining, despite best practices at the time. Due to silica dust exposure, many workers developed silicosis, a debilitating lung disease. According to a marker on site, there were 109 admitted deaths. A congressional hearing placed the death toll at 476, After additional research, author Martin Cherniack estimated the death toll to be 764, making it America's deadliest industrial disaster.

== Asbestos mining and 'Calidria' brand fibers ==
In the early 1960s, Union Carbide Corporation began mining a newly identified outcrop of chrysotile asbestos fibers near King City and New Idria, California. These fibers were sold under the brand name "Calidria", a combination of "Cal" and "Idria", and sold in large quantities for a wide variety of purposes, including additives for joint compound or drywall accessory products. Union Carbide sold the mine to its employees under the name KCAC ("King City Asbestos Mine") in the 1980s, but it only continued operation for a few more years after the transfer of ownership.

== 1984 Bhopal disaster ==
Union Carbide India Limited, owned by Union Carbide (50.9%) and Indian investors which included the government of India (49.1%), operated a pesticide plant in Bhopal, the capital of Madhya Pradesh. This plant was opened in 1969. The pesticides and herbicides they produced were created from an insecticidal compound called carbaryl, which, itself is produced using a chemical intermediate, methyl isocyanate (MIC).

Initially this plant imported MIC, but in 1979, after continued pressure from the Indian government to produce the upstream chemical intermediates domestically, the company decided to manufacture the ingredients in Bhopal. This plant was located next to a very poor, densely populated neighbourhood, and heavily trafficked railway station, which was in violation of the 1975 Bhopal Development Plan requiring that hazardous industries such as the MIC plant be located in a different part of the city that was further away and downwind from densely populated areas. According to one of the authors of the Bhopal Development Plan, "Union Carbide India Limited's" initial application for a permit was rejected, but due to connections steming, in part, from government co-ownership of the company, it was able to gain approval from centralized governing authorities.

Around midnight on 3 December 1984, gas was accidentally released from the plant, exposing more than 500,000 people to MIC and other chemicals. The Government of Madhya Pradesh confirmed a total of 16,000 deaths related to the gas release with an additional 40,000 individuals permanently disabled, maimed, or suffering from serious illness, making it the world's worst industrial disaster.

Following the incident, organizations representing the victims in Bhopal filed a U.S. $10 billion injury claim against Union Carbide. Additionally, the Government of India filed its own $3.3 billion claim against the company. Union Carbide's response was an offer in the range of $300-$350 million. In 1989, the Supreme Court of India ordered the company to pay $470 million to the Indian government as a final settlement. The settlement amounted to 43 cents per share reducing annual earnings to $4.88 earnings per share.

After the settlement, Union Carbide’s parent company divested its entire stake in UCIL. Carbide insists the accident was an act of sabotage by a plant worker. The plant site has not yet been cleaned up.

Warren Anderson, CEO at the time of the disaster, refused to answer to homicide charges and remained a fugitive from India's courts. The U.S. denied several extradition requests. Anderson died on 29 September 2014 in Florida.

== 1985 West Virginia gas leak ==
The year after the Bhopal disaster, a faulty valve at the UC plant in Institute, West Virginia caused a cloud of gas that injured six employees and caused almost 200 nearby residents to seek medical treatment for respiratory and skin irritation. Union Carbide blamed the leak of aldicarb oxime (made from MIC but does not contain residual MIC), the main ingredient in the farm pesticide Temik, on a valve failure after a buildup of pressure in a storage tank containing 500 pounds of the chemical. A company spokesman insisted that the aldicarb oxime leak "never was a threat to the community."

== Union Carbide in Australia ==
Union Carbide's operations in Australia commenced in 1957, when it purchased the plant of the Australian-owned company Timbrol Ltd. The Timbrol factory was on the shore of Homebush Bay in the Sydney suburb of Rhodes. Homebush Bay is on the Parramatta River which flows into Sydney Harbour. Timbrol produced phenol, the insecticides chlorobenzene/chlorophenol/DDT, and the herbicides 2,4-D and 2,4,5-T. Union Carbide continued the production of the 2,4-D and 2,4,5-T until 1976 and chlorobenzene/chlorophenol/DDT until 1983. Union Carbide also commenced the production of bisphenol A in 1960 and phenol formaldehyde resins in 1964.

Union Carbide reclaimed land on neighboring properties by depositing spent lime and ash into the adjacent marshes in Homebush Bay. This practice, which had been approved by the Maritime Services Board, ceased in 1970.

Union Carbide ceased operations in Australia in 1985. In 1987, the New South Wales Pollution Control Commission ordered Union Carbide to remediate the site. This work, which cost Union Carbide $30 million, was conducted between 1988 and 1993. The work involved excavation and encapsulation of the contaminated soil.

In 2004, the New South Wales Minister for Planning granted consent for additional remediation of the former Union Carbide site to proceed, including parts of Homebush Bay. Approximately 900,000 tons of soil were excavated from the site, 190,000 tons of soil from the adjacent Allied Feeds site, and approximately 50,000 tons of sediment from the bay. Remediation of the Allied Feeds Site was completed in August 2009, Homebush Bay sediments in August 2010, and the Union Carbide site in March 2011. The cost of the remediation work was $35M for the Allied Feeds site, and $100 million for Union Carbide site and Homebush Bay sediments.

== New York headquarters building ==
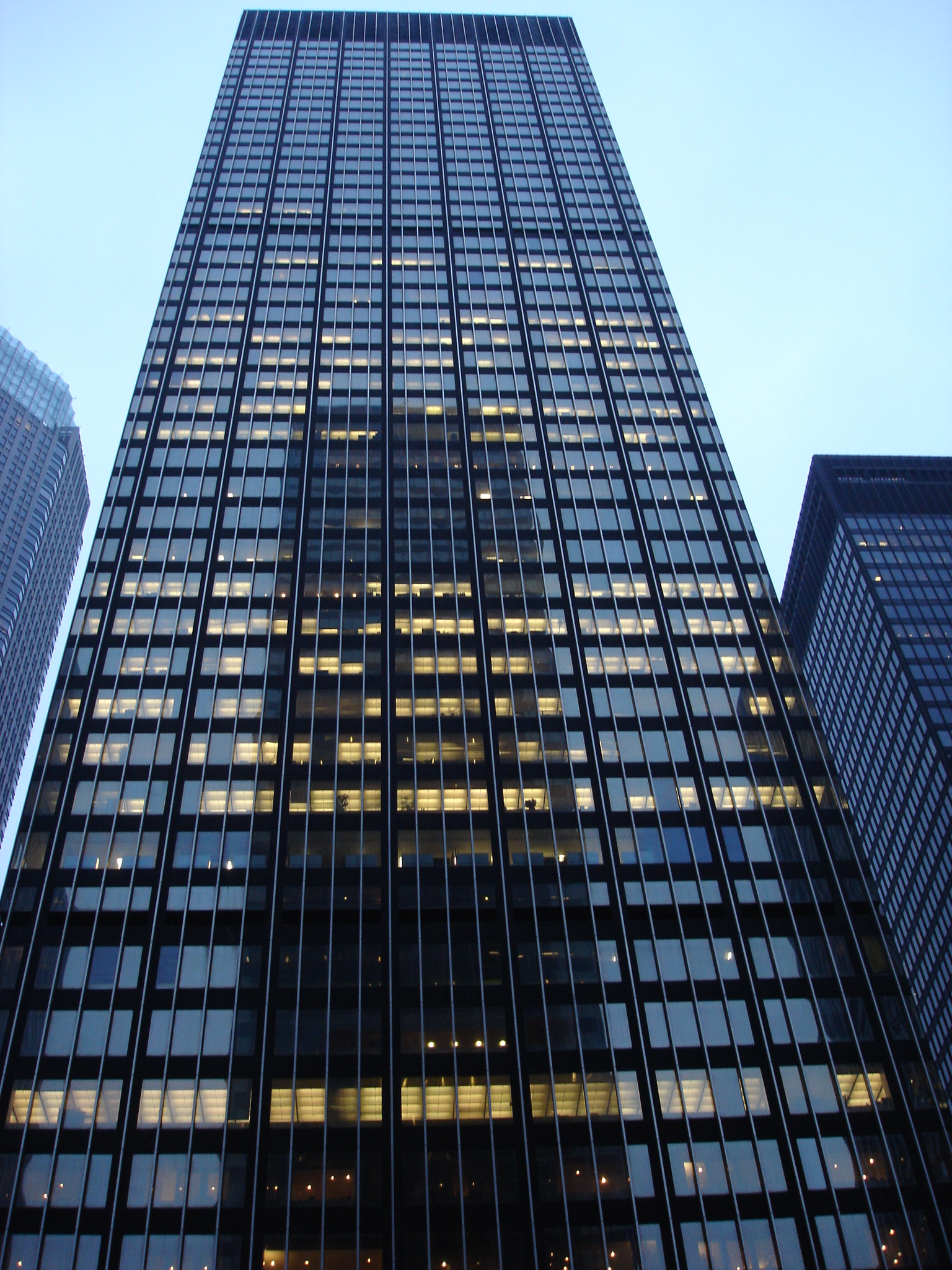
The Union Carbide Building in Manhattan opened in 1960 and was designed by Skidmore, Owings & Merrill

The former Union Carbide headquarters building, at 270 Park Avenue in New York City, was a 52-story modernist office building designed by architectural firm Skidmore, Owings & Merrill and completed in 1960. The company relocated its headquarters to Danbury, Connecticut in 1983, to a newly built complex known as the Union Carbide Corporate Center. 270 Park Avenue later became the headquarters of JPMorgan Chase. The building was demolished and replaced with a new 423-metre-tall (1,388 ft) tower opened in 2025, serving as the consolidated headquarters for JPMorgan Chase. At 700 feet (210 m) tall, the Union Carbide Building was the tallest building in the world ever voluntarily demolished at the time.

== Leadership ==
=== President ===
1. George O. Knapp, 1917–1925
2. Jesse J. Ricks, 1925–1941
3. Benjamin O'Shea, 1941–1944
4. Fred H. Haggerson, 1944–1952
5. Morse G. Dial, 1952–1958
6. Howard S. Bunn, 1958–1960
7. Birny Mason Jr., 1960–1966
8. Kenneth Rush, 1966–1969
9. F. Perry Wilson, 1969–1971
10. William S. Sneath, 1971–1976
11. Warren M. Anderson, 1976–1982
12. Alec Flamm, 1982–1985
13. Robert D. Kennedy and Heinn F. (Tom) Tomfohrde III, 1985-1986
14. Robert D. Kennedy, 1987-1989
15. H. William Lichtenberger, 1990-1993
16. William H. Joyce, 1993-2001

=== Chairman of the Board ===
1. Fred H. Haggerson, 1951–1958
2. Morse G. Dial, 1958–1966
3. Birny Mason Jr., 1966–1971
4. F. Perry Wilson, 1971–1976
5. William S. Sneath, 1976–1982
6. Warren M. Anderson, 1982–1986
7. Robert D. Kennedy, 1986–1995
8. William H. Joyce, 1995-2001

== See also ==
- BASF
- National Carbon Company
- Carbide & Carbon Building
- Union Carbide Corporate Center
- Bhopal disaster
