= Lithium-ion battery components =

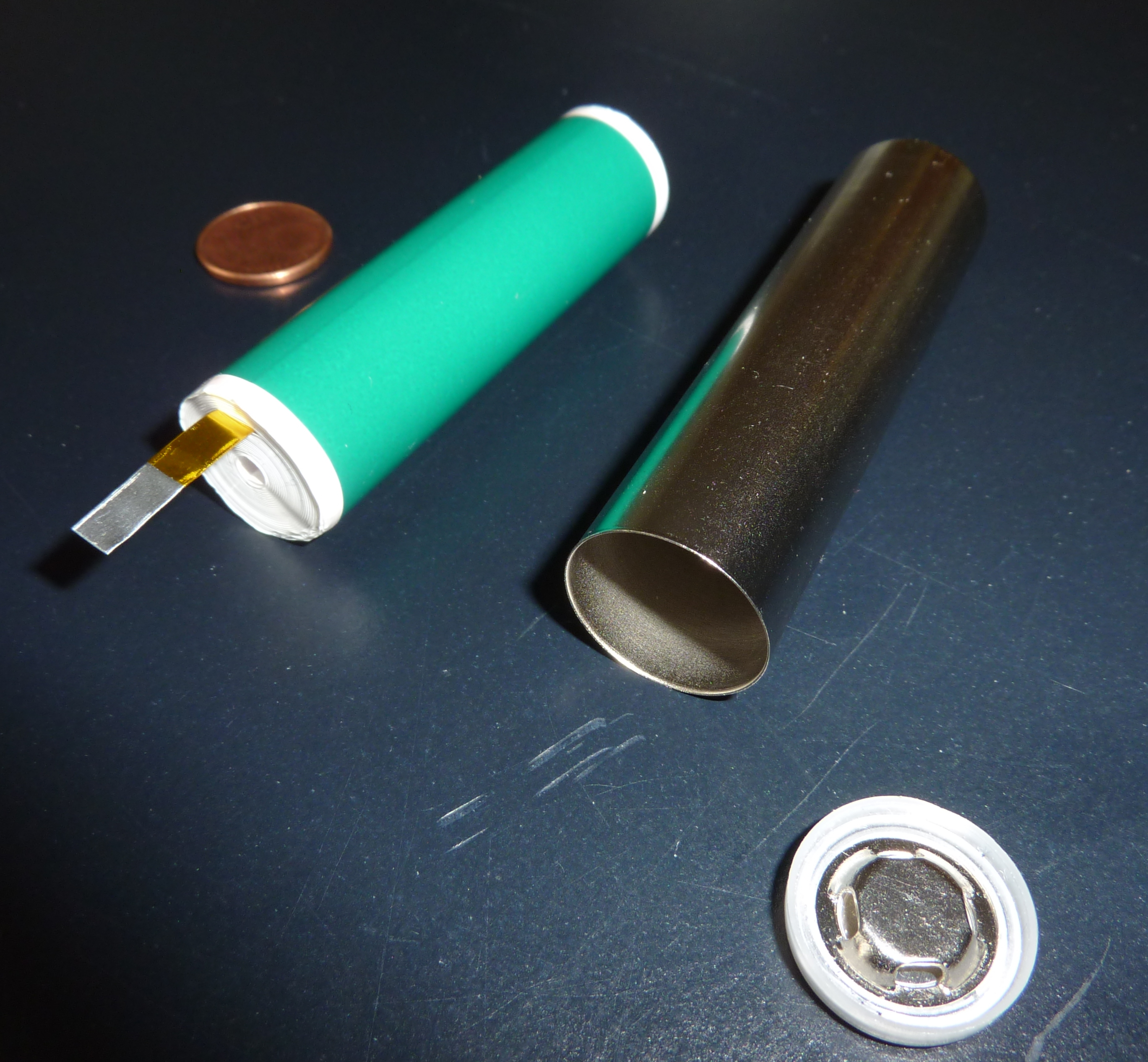
Cylindrical Panasonic 18650 lithium-ion cell before closing

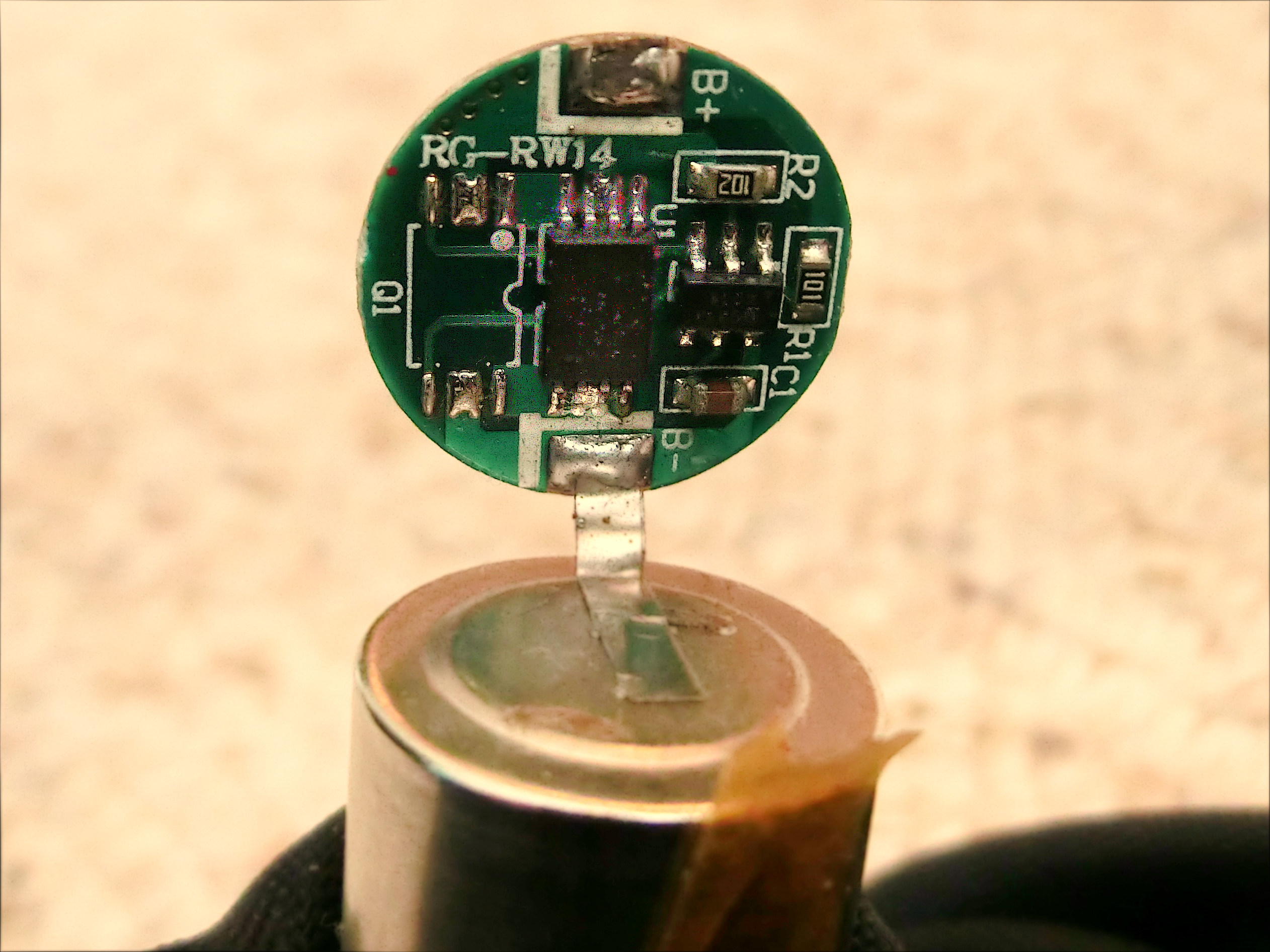
Lithium-ion battery monitoring electronics (over-charge and deep-discharge protection)

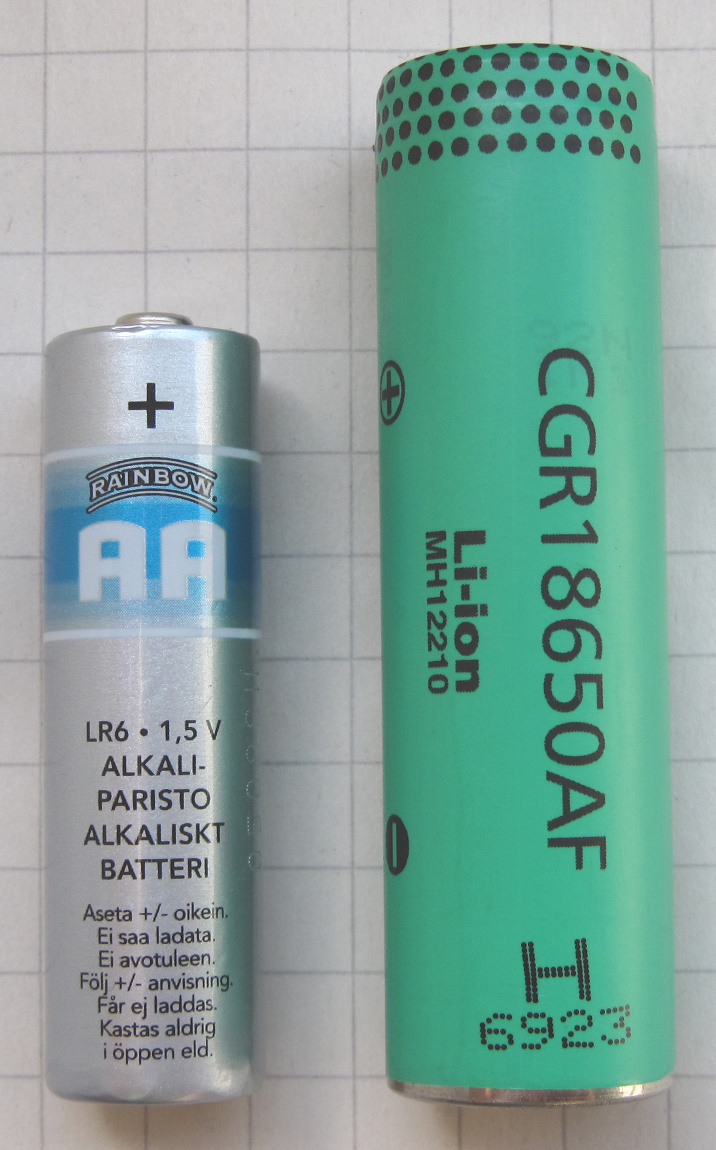
Left: AA alkaline battery. Right: 18650 lithium-ion battery

Lithium-ion batteries are constructed of several key components, including an anode, cathode, separator, casing, electrolyte, and a pair of current collectors.

Typically, the negative electrode of a conventional lithium-ion cell is made from graphite. The positive electrode is typically a metal oxide or phosphate. The electrolyte is a lithium salt in an organic solvent. The negative electrode (which is the anode when the cell is discharging) and the positive electrode (which is the cathode when discharging) are prevented from shorting by a separator. The electrodes are connected to the powered circuit through two pieces of metal called current collectors.

The negative and positive electrodes swap their electrochemical roles (anode and cathode) when the cell is charged. Despite this, in discussions of battery design the negative electrode of a rechargeable cell is often just called "the anode" and the positive electrode "the cathode".

In its fully lithiated state of LiC_{6}, graphite correlates to a theoretical capacity of 1339 coulombs per gram (372 mAh/g). The positive electrode is generally one of three materials: a layered oxide (such as lithium cobalt oxide), a polyanion (such as lithium iron phosphate) or a spinel (such as lithium manganese oxide). More experimental materials include graphene-containing electrodes, although these remain far from commercially viable due to their high cost.

Lithium reacts vigorously with water to form lithium hydroxide (LiOH) and hydrogen gas. Thus, a non-aqueous electrolyte is typically used, and a sealed container rigidly excludes moisture from the battery pack. The non-aqueous electrolyte is typically a mixture of organic carbonates such as ethylene carbonate and propylene carbonate containing complexes of lithium ions. Ethylene carbonate is essential for making solid electrolyte interphase on the carbon anode, but since it is solid at room temperature, a liquid solvent (such as propylene carbonate or diethyl carbonate) is added.

The electrolyte salt is almost always lithium hexafluorophosphate (LiPF_{6}), which combines good ionic conductivity with chemical and electrochemical stability. The hexafluorophosphate anion is essential for passivating the aluminium current collector used for the positive electrode. A titanium tab is ultrasonically welded to the aluminium current collector. Other salts like lithium perchlorate (LiClO_{4}), lithium tetrafluoroborate (LiBF_{4}), and lithium bis(trifluoromethanesulfonyl)imide (LiC_{2}F_{6}NO_{4}S_{2}) are frequently used in research in tab-less coin cells, but are not usable in larger format cells, often because they are not compatible with the aluminium current collector. Copper (with a spot-welded nickel tab) is used as the current collector at the negative electrode.

Current collector design and surface treatments may take various forms: foil, mesh, foam (dealloyed), etched (wholly or selectively), and coated (with various materials) to improve electrical characteristics.

Depending on materials choices, the voltage, energy density, life, and safety of a lithium-ion cell can change dramatically. Current effort has been exploring the use of novel architectures using nanotechnology to improve performance. Areas of interest include nano-scale electrode materials and alternative electrode structures.

The manufacturing of lithium-ion batteries and their components requires the use of cleanrooms. The electrolyte filling and subsequent sealing steps are carried out autonomously inside dry rooms, which are cleanrooms with an extremely low dew point, often below -50 degrees Celsius. This is because electrolytes such as Lithium hexafluorophosphate are highly sensitive to moisture which can reduce lifespan measured in charge cycles or battery capacity. The concentration of H2O in air must be kept below 100 parts per million. Cathode coating, and cell assembly (not battery pack assembly) can also be carried out inside these rooms. The room can be divided into zones with several humidity levels, with the most dry reserved for the electrolyte filling and cell sealing areas, and the others reserved for cathode coating and cell assembly. Dedicated dehumidification units (DHUs) are used to dry the air, which use an absorption process with silica desiccant on a wheel which absorbs humidity from an airstream as it passes through the wheel and then the wheel rotates into another airstream to regenerate the desiccant by drying it with heated air. The rooms have airlocks. These are also known as desiccant dehumidifiers. Personal protective equipment is required to enter the rooms during operation due to the adverse health effects of dry air.

== Cathode ==
Transition metal oxides (TMOs) are widely used as cathode materials as the variable oxidation state of transition metal cations allows these oxides to reversibly host lithium ions (Li⁺) and undergo efficient redox (reduction-oxidation) reactions. While oxygen ions are commonly assumed to remain in a 2- oxidation state, the role of oxygen redox in facilitating lithium insertion is instrumental in these cathodes. The layered or framework structures of TMOs allow Li⁺ insertion/extraction during charging/discharging, while their transition metals and oxygen anions participate in electron transfer, enabling high energy density and stability. Three classes have been commercialized: (1) layered oxides, (2) spinel oxides and (3) oxoanion complexes. All were discovered by Goodenough and his collaborators.

Common cathode materials
Technology	Major producers (2023)	Target application	Notes
Lithium nickel manganese cobalt oxide NMC, LiNi_{x}Mn_{y}Co_{z}O_{2}	Ronbay Technology, Easpring, EcoPro, Umicore, L&F, Posco	Electric vehicles, power tools, grid energy storage	Good specific energy and specific power density
Lithium nickel cobalt aluminium oxide NCA, LiNiCoAlO_{2}	Ronbay Technology, EcoPro	Electric vehicles, power tools, grid energy storage	High energy density, good life span
Lithium nickel cobalt manganese aluminium oxide NCMA, LiNi_{0.89}Co_{0.05}Mn_{0.05}Al_{0.01}O_{2}	LG Chem, Hanyang University	Electric vehicles, grid energy storage	Good specific energy, improved long-term cycling stability, faster charging
Lithium manganese oxide LMO, LiMn_{2}O_{4} and lithium manganese rich (LMR)	Posco, L&F	Power tools, electric vehicles	Fast charging speed, cheap, low cycle life
Lithium iron phosphate LFP, LiFePO_{4}	Shenzhen Dynanonic, Hunan Yuneng, LOPAL, Ronbay Technology	Electric vehicles, grid energy storage	Better safety, long cycle life, cheap, good thermal stability >60 °C (140 °F)
Lithium cobalt oxide LCO, LiCoO_{2}	Easpring, Umicore	Handheld electronics	High energy density

=== Layered oxides ===
LiCoO_{2} was used in the first commercial lithium-ion battery made by Sony in 1991. The layered oxides have a pseudo-tetrahedral structure comprising layers made of MO_{6} octahedra separated by interlayer spaces that allow for two-dimensional lithium-ion diffusion. The band structure of Li_{x}CoO_{2} allows for true electronic (rather than polaronic) conductivity. However, due to an overlap between the Co^{4+} t_{2g} d-band with the O^{2-} 2p-band, the x must be >0.5, otherwise O_{2} evolution occurs. This limits the charge capacity of this material to ~140 mA h g^{−1}.

Several other first-row (3d) transition metals also form layered LiMO_{2} salts. Some can be directly prepared from lithium oxide and M_{2}O_{3} (e.g. for M=Ti, V, Cr, Co, Ni), while others (M= Mn or Fe) can be prepared by ion exchange from NaMO_{2}. LiVO_{2}, LiMnO_{2} and LiFeO_{2} suffer from structural instabilities (including mixing between M and Li sites) due to a low energy difference between octahedral and tetrahedral environments for the metal ion M. For this reason, they are not used. However, Na^{+} and Fe^{3+} have sufficiently different sizes that NaFeO_{2} can be used in sodium-ion batteries.

Similarly, LiCrO_{2} shows reversible lithium (de)intercalation around 3.2 V with 170–270 mAh/g. However, its cycle life is short, because of disproportionation of Cr^{4+} followed by translocation of Cr^{6+} into tetrahedral sites. On the other hand, NaCrO_{2} shows a much better cycling stability. LiTiO_{2} shows Li+ (de)intercalation at a voltage of ~1.5 V, which is too low for a cathode material.

These problems leave LiCoO_{2} and LiNiO_{2} as the only practical layered oxide materials for lithium-ion battery cathodes. The cobalt-based cathodes show high theoretical specific (per-mass) charge capacity, high volumetric capacity, low self-discharge, high discharge voltage, and good cycling performance. Unfortunately, they suffer from a high cost of the material.

In addition to a lower (than cobalt) cost, nickel-oxide based materials benefit from the two-electron redox chemistry of Ni: in layered oxides comprising nickel (such as nickel-cobalt-manganese NCM and nickel-cobalt-aluminium oxides NCA), Ni cycles between the oxidation states +2 and +4 (in one step between +3.5 and +4.3 V), cobalt- between +2 and +3, while Mn (usually >20%) and Al (typically, only 5% is needed) remain in +4 and 3+, respectively. Thus increasing the Ni content increases the cyclable charge. For example, NCM111 shows 160 mAh/g, while LiNi_{0.8}Co_{0.1}Mn_{0.1}O_{2} (NCM811) and LiNi_{0.8}Co_{0.15}Al_{0.05}O_{2} (NCA) deliver a higher capacity of ~200 mAh/g. NCM and NCA batteries are collectively called ternary lithium batteries.

It is worth mentioning so-called "lithium-rich" cathodes that can be produced from traditional NCM (LiMO_{2}, where M=Ni, Co, Mn) layered cathode materials upon cycling them to voltages/charges corresponding to Li:M<0.5. Under such conditions a new semi-reversible redox transition at a higher voltage with ca. 0.4-0.8 electrons/metal site charge appears. This transition involves non-binding electron orbitals centered mostly on O atoms. Despite significant initial interest, this phenomenon did not result in marketable products because of the fast structural degradation (O2 evolution and lattice rearrangements) of such "lithium-rich" phases.

=== Cubic oxides (spinels) ===
LiMn_{2}O_{4} adopts a cubic lattice, which allows for three-dimensional lithium-ion diffusion. Manganese cathodes are attractive because manganese is less expensive than cobalt or nickel. The operating voltage of Li-LiMn_{2}O_{4} battery is 4 V, and ca. one lithium per two Mn ions can be reversibly extracted from the tetrahedral sites, resulting in a practical capacity of <130 mA h g–1. However, Mn^{3+} is not a stable oxidation state, as it tends to disproportionate into insoluble Mn^{4+} and soluble Mn^{2+}. LiMn_{2}O_{4} can also intercalate more than 0.5 Li per Mn at a lower voltage around +3.0 V. However, this results in an irreversible phase transition due to Jahn-Teller distortion in Mn3+:t2g3eg1, as well as disproportionation and dissolution of Mn^{3+}.

An important improvement of Mn spinel are related cubic structures of the LiMn_{1.5}Ni_{0.5}O_{4} type, where Mn exists as Mn4+ and Ni cycles reversibly between the oxidation states +2 and +4. This materials show a reversible Li-ion capacity of ca. 135 mAh/g around 4.7 V. Although such high voltage is beneficial for increasing the specific energy of batteries, the adoption of such materials is currently hindered by the lack of suitable high-voltage electrolytes. In general, materials with a high nickel content are favored in 2023, because of the possibility of a 2-electron cycling of Ni between the oxidation states +2 and +4.

LiV_{2}O_{4} (lithium vanadium oxide) operates as a lower (ca. +3.0 V) voltage than LiMn_{2}O_{4}, suffers from similar durability issues, is more expensive, and thus is not considered of practical interest.

=== Oxoanionic ===
Around 1980 Manthiram discovered that oxoanions (molybdates and tungstates in that particular case) cause a substantial positive shift in the redox potential of the metal-ion compared to oxides. In addition, these oxoanionic cathode materials offer better stability/safety than the corresponding oxides. However, they also suffer from poor electronic conductivity due to the long distance between redox-active metal centers, which slows down the electron transport. This necessitates the use of small (less than 200 nm) cathode particles and coating each particle with a layer of electronically-conducting carbon. This reduces the packing density of these materials.

Although numerous combinations of oxoanions (sulfate, phosphate, silicate) with various metals (mostly Mn, Fe, Co, Ni) have been studied, LiFePO_{4} is the only one that has been commercialized. Although it was originally used primarily for stationary energy storage due to its lower energy density compared to layered oxides, it has begun to be widely used in electric vehicles since the 2020s.

== Anode ==
Negative electrode materials are traditionally constructed from graphite and other carbon materials, although newer silicon-based materials are being increasingly used (see Nanowire battery). In 2016, 89% of lithium-ion batteries contained graphite (43% artificial and 46% natural), 7% contained amorphous carbon (either soft carbon or hard carbon), 2% contained lithium titanate (LTO) and 2% contained silicon or tin-based materials.

These materials are used because they are abundant, electrically conducting and can intercalate lithium ions to store electrical charge with modest volume expansion (~10%). Graphite is the dominant material because of its low intercalation voltage and excellent performance. Various alternative materials with higher capacities have been proposed, but they usually have higher voltages, which reduces energy density. Low voltage is the key requirement for anodes; otherwise, the excess capacity is useless in terms of energy density.

Negative electrode
Technology	Energy density	Durability	Company	Target application	Comments
Graphite	260 Wh/kg		Tesla	The dominant negative electrode material, max capacity of 372 mAh/g.	Low cost and good energy density. Graphite anodes can accommodate one lithium atom for every six carbon atoms. Charging rate is governed by the shape of the long, thin graphene sheets that constitute graphite. While charging, the lithium ions must travel to the outer edges of the graphene sheet before coming to rest (intercalating) between the sheets. The circuitous route takes so long that they encounter congestion around those edges.
Lithium titanate LTO, Li_{4}Ti_{5}O_{12}			Toshiba, Altairnano	Automotive (Phoenix Motorcars), electrical grid (PJM Interconnection Regional Transmission Organization control area, United States Department of Defense), bus (Proterra)	Improved output, charging time, durability (safety, operating temperature −50–70 °C (−58–158 °F)).
Hard carbon			Energ2	Home electronics	Greater storage capacity.
Tin/cobalt alloy			Sony	Consumer electronics (Sony Nexelion battery)	Larger capacity than a cell with graphite (3.5 Ah 18650-type cell).
Silicon/carbon; Si/C	730 Wh/L; 450 Wh/kg		Amprius	Smartphones, providing 5000 mAh capacity	Pure Si can present a capacity density around 4200 mAh/g, but it will undergo a severe volume expansion (>300%), so it is often mixed with graphite. Another approach used carbon-coated 15 nm thick crystal silicon flakes. The tested half-cell achieved 1200 mAh/g over 800 cycles.

As graphite is limited to a maximum capacity of 372 mAh/g much research has been dedicated to the development of materials that exhibit higher theoretical capacities and overcoming the technical challenges that presently encumber their implementation. The extensive 2007 Review Article by Kasavajjula et al. summarizes early research on silicon-based anodes for lithium-ion secondary cells. In particular, Hong Li et al. showed in 2000 that the electrochemical insertion of lithium ions in silicon nanoparticles and silicon nanowires leads to the formation of an amorphous Li–Si alloy. The same year, Bo Gao and his doctoral advisor, Professor Otto Zhou described the cycling of electrochemical cells with anodes comprising silicon nanowires, with a reversible capacity ranging from at least approximately 900 to 1500 mAh/g.

Diamond-like carbon coatings can increase retention capacity by 40% and cycle life by 400% for lithium based batteries.

To improve the stability of the lithium anode, several approaches to installing a protective layer have been suggested. Silicon is beginning to be looked at as an anode material because it can accommodate significantly more lithium ions, storing up to 10 times the electric charge, however this alloying between lithium and silicon results in significant volume expansion (ca. 400%), which causes catastrophic failure for the cell. Silicon has been used as an anode material but the insertion and extraction of $\ce{\scriptstyle Li+}$ can create cracks in the material. These cracks expose the Si surface to an electrolyte, causing decomposition and the formation of a solid electrolyte interphase (SEI) on the new Si surface (crumpled graphene encapsulated Si nanoparticles). This SEI will continue to grow thicker, deplete the available $\ce{\scriptstyle Li+}$, and degrade the capacity and cycling stability of the anode.

In addition to carbon- and silicon- based anode materials for lithium-ion batteries, high-entropy metal oxide materials are being developed. These conversion (rather than intercalation) materials comprise an alloy (or subnanometer mixed phases) of several metal oxides performing different functions. For example, Zn and Co can act as electroactive charge-storing species, Cu can provide an electronically conducting support phase and MgO can prevent pulverization.

== Electrolyte ==
Liquid electrolytes consist of lithium salts, such as LiPF_{6}, LiBF_{4}, LiFSI, LiTFSI or LiClO_{4} in an organic solvent, such as ethylene carbonate, dimethyl carbonate, and diethyl carbonate. A liquid electrolyte acts as a conductive pathway for the movement of cations passing from the negative to the positive electrodes during discharge. Typical conductivities of liquid electrolyte at room temperature (20 °C (68 °F)) are in the range of 10 mS/cm, increasing by approximately 30–40% at 40 °C (104 °F) and decreasing slightly at 0 °C (32 °F). The combination of linear and cyclic carbonates (e.g., ethylene carbonate (EC) and dimethyl carbonate (DMC)) offers high conductivity and solid electrolyte interphase (SEI)-forming ability. While EC forms a stable SEI, it is not a liquid at room temperature, only becoming a liquid with the addition of additives such as the previously mentioned DMC or diethyl carbonate (DEC) or ethyl methyl carbonate (EMC). Organic solvents easily decompose on the negative electrodes during charge. When appropriate organic solvents are used as the electrolyte, the solvent decomposes on initial charging and forms a solid layer called the solid electrolyte interphase, which is electrically insulating, yet provides significant ionic conductivity, behaving as a solid electrolyte. The interphase prevents further decomposition of the electrolyte after the second charge as it grows thick enough to prevent electron tunneling after the first charge cycle. For example, ethylene carbonate is decomposed at a relatively high voltage, 0.7 V vs. lithium, and forms a dense and stable interface. Composite electrolytes based on POE (poly(oxyethylene)) provide a relatively stable interface. It can be either solid (high molecular weight) and be applied in dry Li-polymer cells, or liquid (low molecular weight) and be applied in regular Li-ion cells. Room-temperature ionic liquids (RTILs) are another approach to limiting the flammability and volatility of organic electrolytes.

=== Solid electrolyte interphase (SEI) ===
The term solid electrolyte interphase was first coined by Peled in 1979 to describe the layer of insoluble products deposited on alkali and alkaline earth cathodes in non-aqueous batteries (NAB). However, Dey and Sullivan had noted previously in 1970 that graphite, in a lithium metal half cell using propylene carbonate (PC), reduced the electrolyte during discharge at a rate which linearly increased with the current. They proposed that the following reaction was taking place:

$$\ce{C4H6O3 + 2e- -> CH3-CH=CH2 + CO3^{2-}}$$

The same reaction was later proposed by Fong et al in 1990, where they theorized that the carbonate ion was reacting with the lithium to form lithium carbonate, which was then forming a passivating layer on the surface of the graphite. PC is not commonly used in batteries today as the molecules can intercalate into the graphite layers and react with the lithium there to form propylene and acts to delaminate the graphite.

The insulating properties of the SEI allow the battery to reach more extreme voltage gaps without simply reducing the electrolyte. This ability of the SEI to improve the voltage window of batteries was discovered almost by accident but plays a vital role in high voltage batteries today.

The structure of the SEI is commonly described by two models developed before direct imaging techniques became available. In the mosaic model proposed by Peled, the interphase is a heterogeneous mixture in which crystalline inorganic decomposition products such as lithium oxide (Li_{2}O) and lithium carbonate (Li_{2}CO_{3}) are dispersed within an organic matrix. In the alternative multilayer (or layered) model proposed by Aurbach, the decomposition products are instead arranged in distinct layers. More recent reviews often reconcile these pictures with a bilayer description, in which a dense inorganic inner layer conducts lithium ions while blocking electrons, and a porous organic outer layer accommodates the volume changes that occur during cycling.

=== Solid electrolytes ===
Recent advances in battery technology involve using a solid as the electrolyte material. The most promising of these are ceramics. Solid ceramic electrolytes are mostly lithium metal oxides, which allow lithium-ion transport through the solid more readily due to the intrinsic lithium. The main benefit of solid electrolytes is that there is no risk of leaks, which is a serious safety issue for batteries with liquid electrolytes. Solid ceramic electrolytes can be further broken down into two main categories: ceramic and glassy. Ceramic solid electrolytes are highly ordered compounds with crystal structures that usually have ion transport channels. Common ceramic electrolytes are lithium super ion conductors (LISICON) and perovskites. Glassy solid electrolytes are amorphous atomic structures made up of similar elements to ceramic solid electrolytes but have higher conductivities overall due to higher conductivity at grain boundaries. Both glassy and ceramic electrolytes can be made more ionically conductive by substituting sulfur for oxygen. The larger radius of sulfur and its higher ability to be polarized allow higher conductivity of lithium. This contributes to conductivities of solid electrolytes are nearing parity with their liquid counterparts, with most on the order of 0.1 mS/cm and the best at 10 mS/cm. An efficient and economic way to tune targeted electrolytes properties is by adding a third component in small concentrations, known as an additive. By adding the additive in small amounts, the bulk properties of the electrolyte system will not be affected whilst the targeted property can be significantly improved. The numerous additives that have been tested can be divided into the following three distinct categories: (1) those used for SEI chemistry modifications; (2) those used for enhancing the ion conduction properties; (3) those used for improving the safety of the cell (e.g. prevent overcharging).

Electrolyte alternatives have also played a significant role, for example the lithium polymer battery. Polymer electrolytes are promising for minimizing the dendrite formation of lithium. Polymers are supposed to prevent short circuits and maintain conductivity.

The ions in the electrolyte diffuse because there are small changes in the electrolyte concentration. Linear diffusion is only considered here. The change in concentration c, as a function of time t and distance x, is

$$\frac{\partial c}{\partial t} = \frac{D}{\varepsilon} \frac{\partial ^2 c}{\partial x^2}.$$

In this equation, D is the diffusion coefficient for the lithium ion. It has a value of 7.5×10^{−10} m^{2}/s in the LiPF_{6} electrolyte. The value for ε, the porosity of the electrolyte, is 0.724.
