= Lithium-ion battery =

Type of rechargeable battery

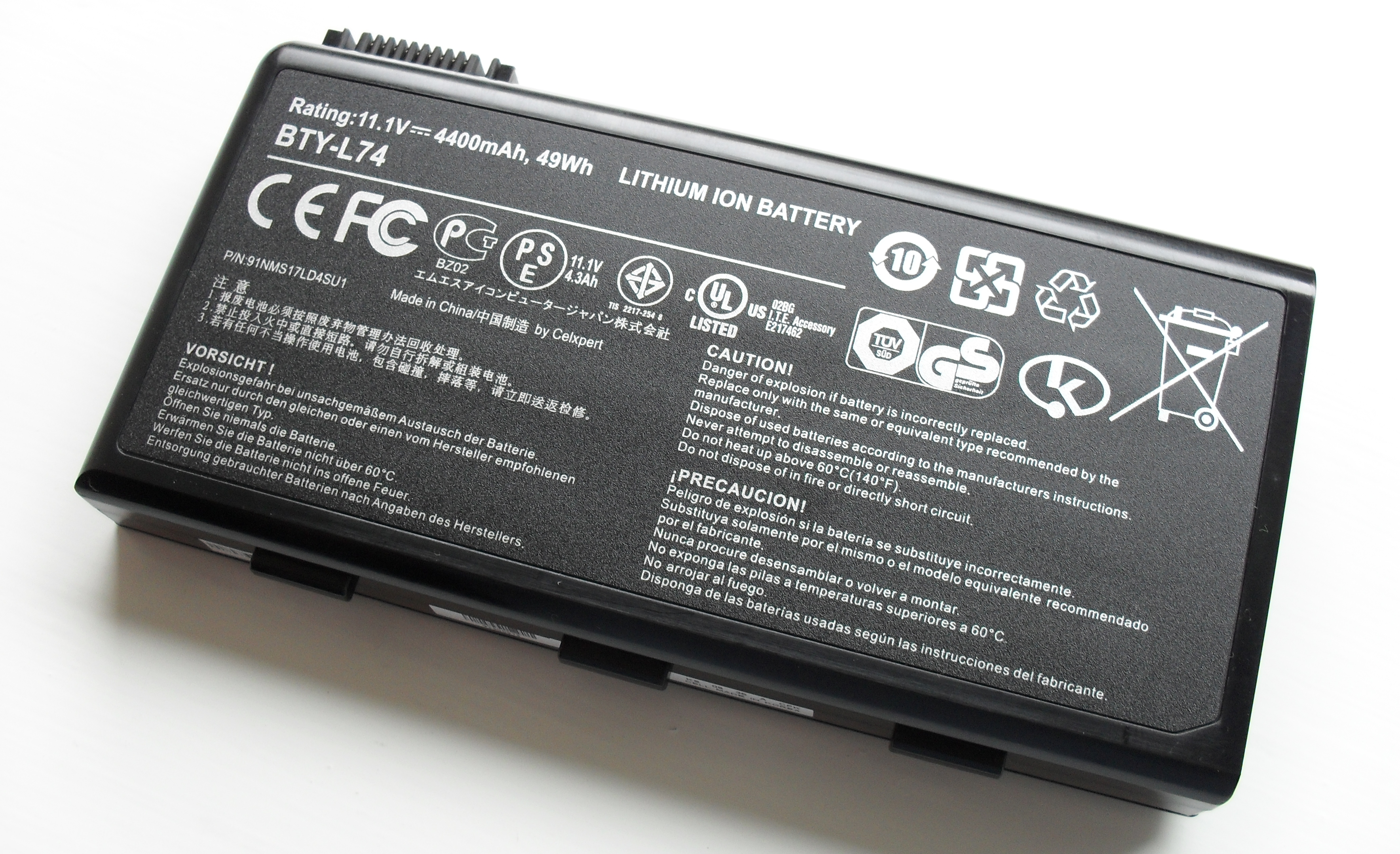
- A lithium-ion battery pack from a laptop computer
- Specific energy: Standard: 160–300 W⋅h/kg (580–1,080 kJ/kg); Specialty: up to 450 W⋅h/kg (1,600 kJ/kg)
- Energy density: Standard: 250–842 W⋅h/L (900–3,030 J/cm^{3}); Specialty: up to 1,100 W⋅h/L (4,000 J/cm^{3})
- Specific power: 1–10,000 W/kg
- Charge/discharge efficiency: 80–90%
- Energy/consumer-price: $108/(kW⋅h), $30/MJ
- Self-discharge rate: 0.35% to 2.5% per month depending on state of charge
- Cycle durability: 400–1,200 cycles
- Nominal cell voltage: 3.6 / 3.7 / 3.8 / 3.85 V, LiFePO_{4} 3.2 V, Li_{4}Ti_{5}O_{12} 2.3 V

A lithium-ion battery or Li-ion battery is a type of rechargeable battery that uses the reversible intercalation of lithium ions (Li^{+}) into electronically conducting solids to store energy. There are many different varieties, which are usually categorized by the materials used in the cathode. Compared to other rechargeable battery types, they generally have higher specific energy, energy density, and energy efficiency and a longer cycle life and calendar life. In the three decades since Li-ion batteries were first sold in 1991, their volumetric energy density increased threefold while their cost dropped tenfold. In late 2024, global demand passed 1 terawatt-hour per year, while production capacity was more than twice that.

The invention and commercialization of Li-ion batteries has had a large impact on technology, as recognized by the 2019 Nobel Prize in Chemistry, which was awarded to contributors to the development of Li-ion batteries. Li-ion batteries have enabled portable consumer electronics, laptop computers, cellular phones, and electric cars. They are used for grid-scale energy storage and in military and aerospace applications. Li-ion battery sizes are generally not standardised (e.g. in the spirit of the AA battery) and they come in various and unique form factors depending on device and vendor. They typically have a nominal voltage of 3.6 or 3.7 V.

M. Stanley Whittingham conceived intercalation electrodes in the 1970s and created the first rechargeable lithium-ion battery, based on a titanium disulfide cathode and a lithium-aluminium anode, although it suffered from safety problems and was never commercialized. John Goodenough expanded on this work in 1980 by using lithium cobalt oxide as a cathode. The first prototype of the modern Li-ion battery, which uses a carbonaceous anode rather than lithium metal, was developed by Akira Yoshino in 1985 and commercialized by a Sony and Asahi Kasei team led by Yoshio Nishi in 1991. Whittingham, Goodenough, and Yoshino were awarded the 2019 Nobel Prize in Chemistry for their contributions to the development of lithium-ion batteries.

Lithium-ion batteries can be a fire or explosion hazard as they contain flammable electrolytes. Progress has been made in the development and manufacturing of safer lithium-ion batteries. Lithium-ion solid-state batteries are being developed to eliminate the flammable electrolyte. Lithium and other minerals can have significant issues in mining, with lithium being water intensive in often arid regions and other minerals used in some Li-ion chemistries potentially being conflict minerals such as cobalt. Environmental issues have encouraged some researchers to improve mineral efficiency and find alternatives such as lithium iron phosphate lithium-ion chemistries or non-lithium-based battery chemistries such as sodium-ion and iron-air batteries.

Lithium-ion cells can be manufactured to optimize energy density or power density. Handheld electronics mostly use lithium polymer batteries (with a polymer gel as an electrolyte), a lithium cobalt oxide (LiCoO_{2}) cathode material, and a graphite anode, which together offer high energy density. Lithium iron phosphate (LiFePO_{4}), lithium manganese oxide (LiMn_{2}O_{4} spinel, or Li_{2}MnO_{3}-based lithium-rich layered materials, LMR-NMC), and lithium nickel manganese cobalt oxide (LiNiMnCoO_{2} or NMC) may offer longer life and a higher discharge rate. NMC and its derivatives are widely used in the electrification of transport, one of the main technologies (combined with renewable energy) for reducing greenhouse gas emissions from vehicles. Lithium nickel cobalt aluminum oxide (NCA) is another high-energy lithium-ion chemistry commonly used in electric vehicle batteries.

== History ==
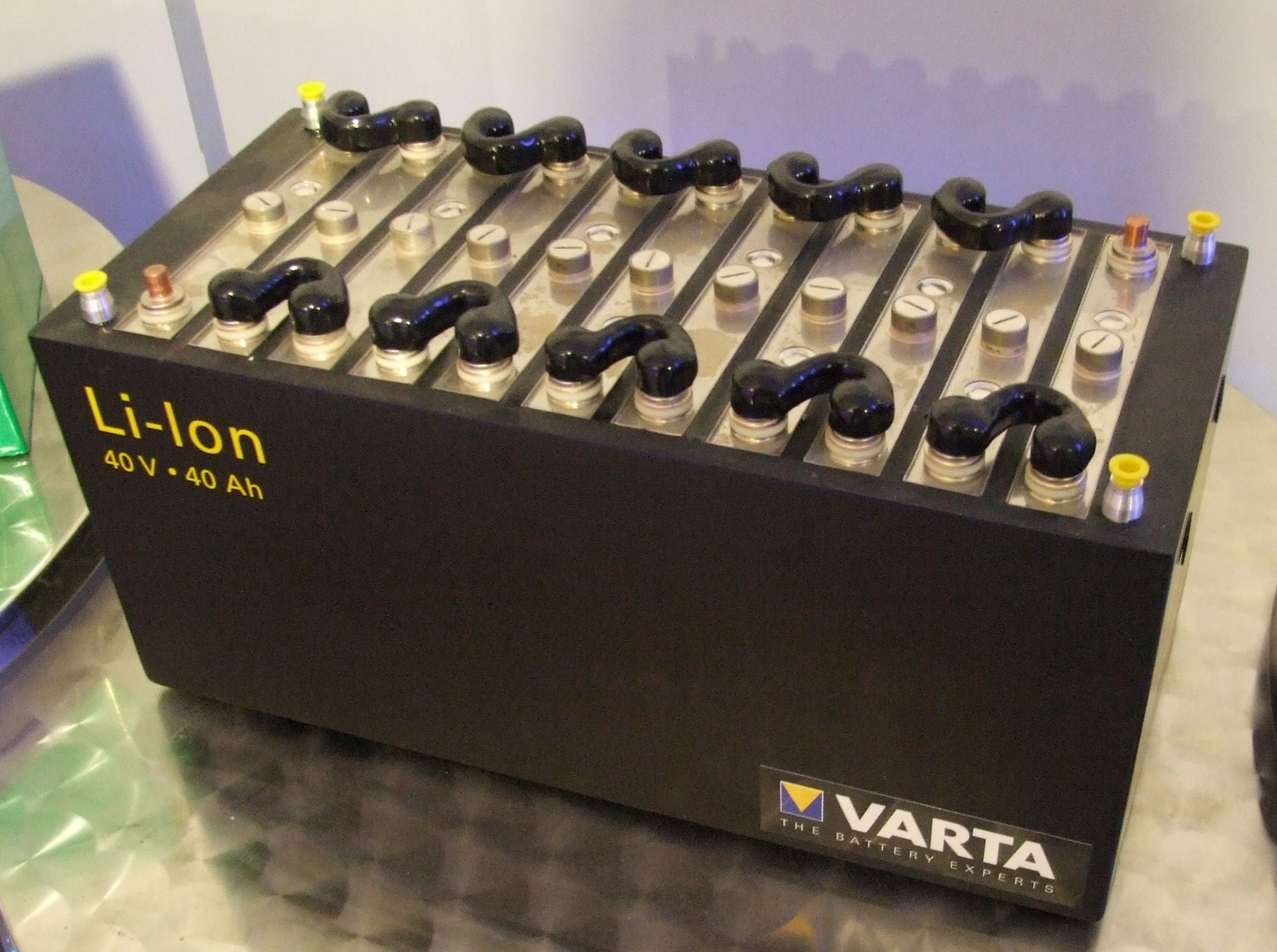
Varta lithium-ion battery, Museum Autovision, Altlussheim, Germany

One of the earliest examples of research into lithium-ion batteries is a CuF_{2}/Li battery developed by NASA in 1965. The breakthrough that produced the earliest form of the modern Li-ion battery was made by British chemist M. Stanley Whittingham in 1974, who first used titanium disulfide (TiS_{2}) as a cathode material, which has a layered structure that can take in lithium ions without significant crystal structure changes. Exxon tried to commercialize this battery in the late 1970s, but found the synthesis expensive and complex, as TiS_{2} is sensitive to moisture and releases toxic hydrogen sulfide (H_{2}S) gas on contact with water. More prohibitively, the batteries were also prone to spontaneously catch fire due to the presence of metallic lithium in the cells. For this, and other reasons, Exxon discontinued the development of Whittingham's lithium-titanium disulfide battery.

In 1980, working in separate groups Ned A. Godshall et al., and, shortly thereafter, Koichi Mizushima and John B. Goodenough, after testing a range of alternative materials, replaced TiS_{2} with lithium cobalt oxide (LiCoO_{2}, or LCO), which has a similar layered structure but offers a higher voltage and much more stability in air. This material would later be used in the first commercial Li-ion battery, although it did not, on its own, resolve the persistent issue of flammability.

These early attempts to develop rechargeable Li-ion batteries used lithium metal anodes, which were ultimately abandoned due to safety concerns, as lithium metal is unstable and prone to dendrite formation, which can cause short-circuiting. The eventual solution was to use an intercalation anode, similar to that used for the cathode, which prevents the formation of lithium metal during battery charging. The first to demonstrate lithium ion reversible intercalation into graphite anodes was Jürgen Otto Besenhard in 1974. Besenhard used organic solvents such as carbonates for an electrolyte, however these solvents decomposed rapidly providing short battery cycle life. Later, in 1980, Rachid Yazami used a solid organic electrolyte, polyethylene oxide, which was more stable.

In 1985, Akira Yoshino at Asahi Kasei Corporation discovered that petroleum coke, a less graphitized form of carbon, can reversibly intercalate Li-ions at a low potential of ~0.5 V relative to Li+ /Li without structural degradation. Its structural stability originates from its amorphous carbon regions, which serve as covalent joints to pin the layers together. Although it has a lower specific capacity compared to graphite (~Li0.5C6, 186 mAh g–1), it became the first commercial intercalation anode for Li-ion batteries owing to its cycling stability. In 1987, Yoshino patented what would become the first commercial lithium-ion battery using this anode. He used Goodenough's previously reported LiCoO_{2} as the cathode and a carbonate ester-based electrolyte. The battery was assembled in the discharged state, which made it safer and cheaper to manufacture. In 1991, using Yoshino's design, Sony began producing and selling the world's first rechargeable lithium-ion batteries. The following year, a joint venture between Toshiba and Asahi Kasei Co. also released a lithium-ion battery. Significant improvements in energy density were achieved in the 1990s by replacing Yoshino's soft carbon anode first with hard carbon and later with graphite.

In 1990, Jeff Dahn and two colleagues at Dalhousie University (Canada) reported reversible intercalation of lithium ions into graphite in the presence of ethylene carbonate solvent (which is solid at room temperature and is mixed with other solvents to make a liquid). This represented the final innovation of the era that created the basic design of the modern lithium-ion battery.

In 2010, global lithium-ion battery production capacity was 20 gigawatt-hours. By 2016, it was 28 GWh, with 16.4 GWh in China. Global production capacity was 767 GWh in 2020, with China accounting for 75%. Production in 2021 is estimated by various sources to be between 200 and 600 GWh, and predictions for 2023 range from 400 to 1,100 GWh.

In 2012, John B. Goodenough, Rachid Yazami and Akira Yoshino received the 2012 IEEE Medal for Environmental and Safety Technologies for developing the lithium-ion battery; Goodenough, Whittingham, and Yoshino were awarded the 2019 Nobel Prize in Chemistry "for the development of lithium-ion batteries". Jeff Dahn received the ECS Battery Division Technology Award (2011) and the Yeager award from the International Battery Materials Association (2016).

== Components ==
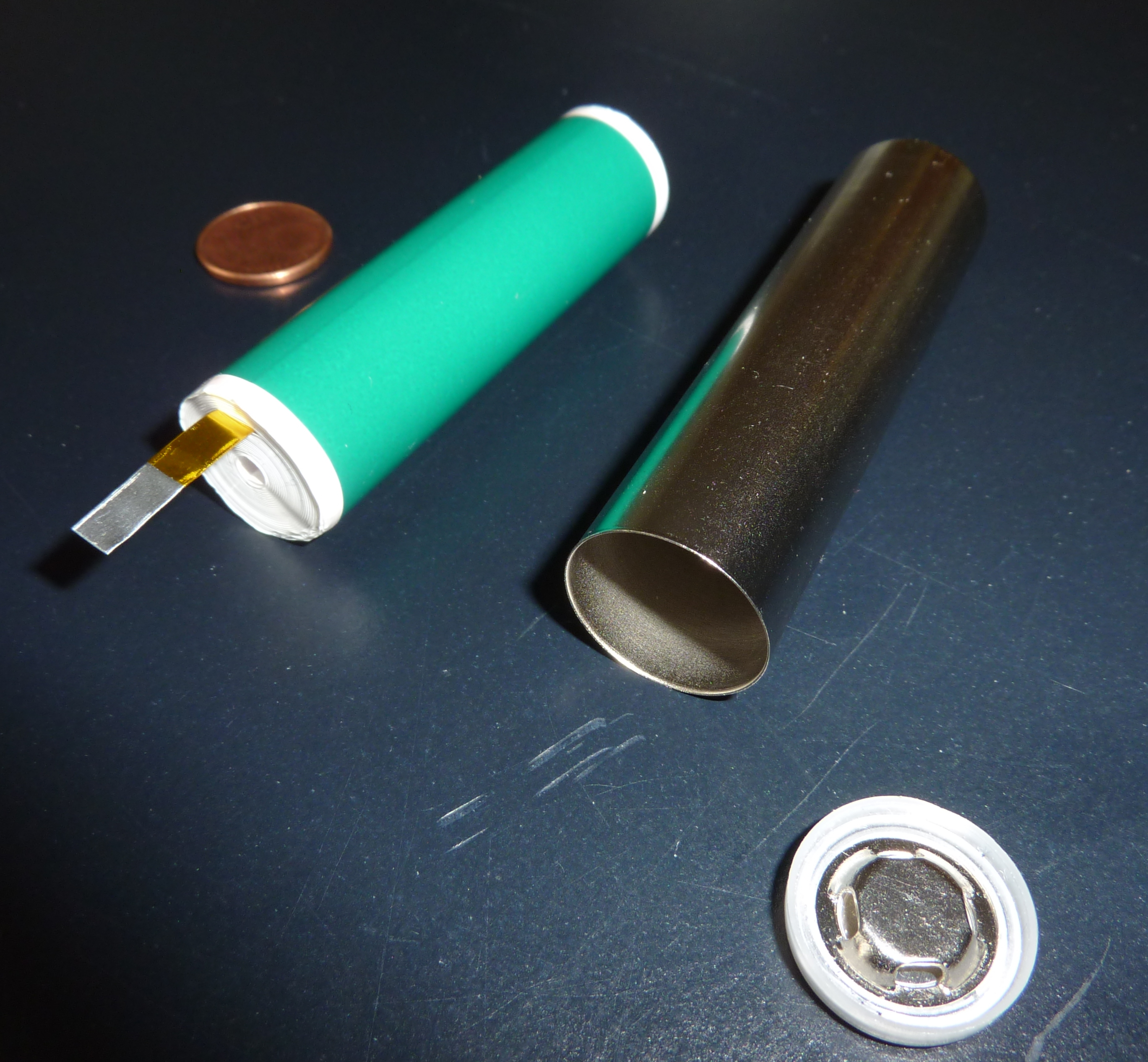
Cylindrical Panasonic 18650 lithium-ion cell before closing

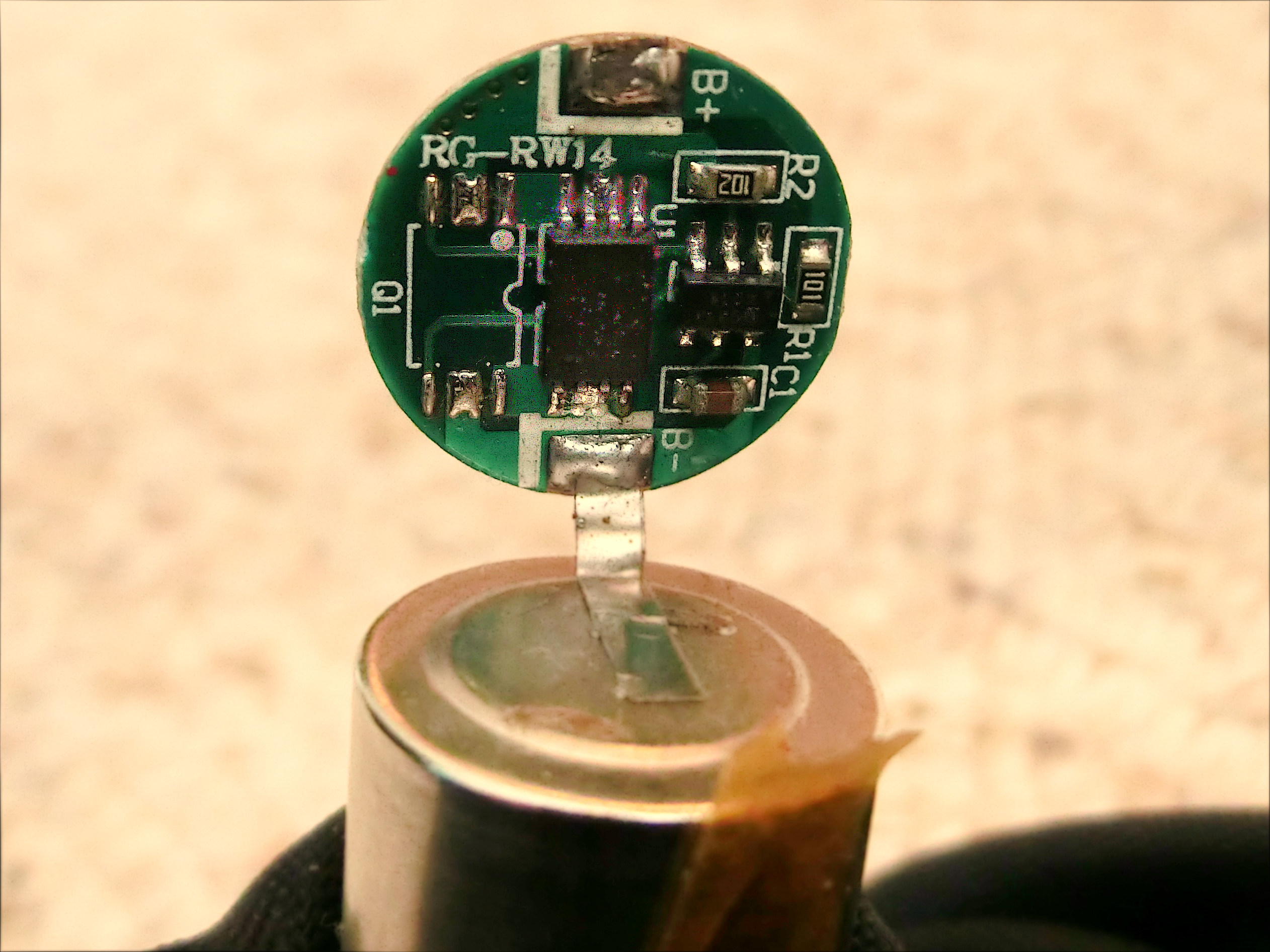
Lithium-ion battery monitoring electronics (over-charge and deep-discharge protection)

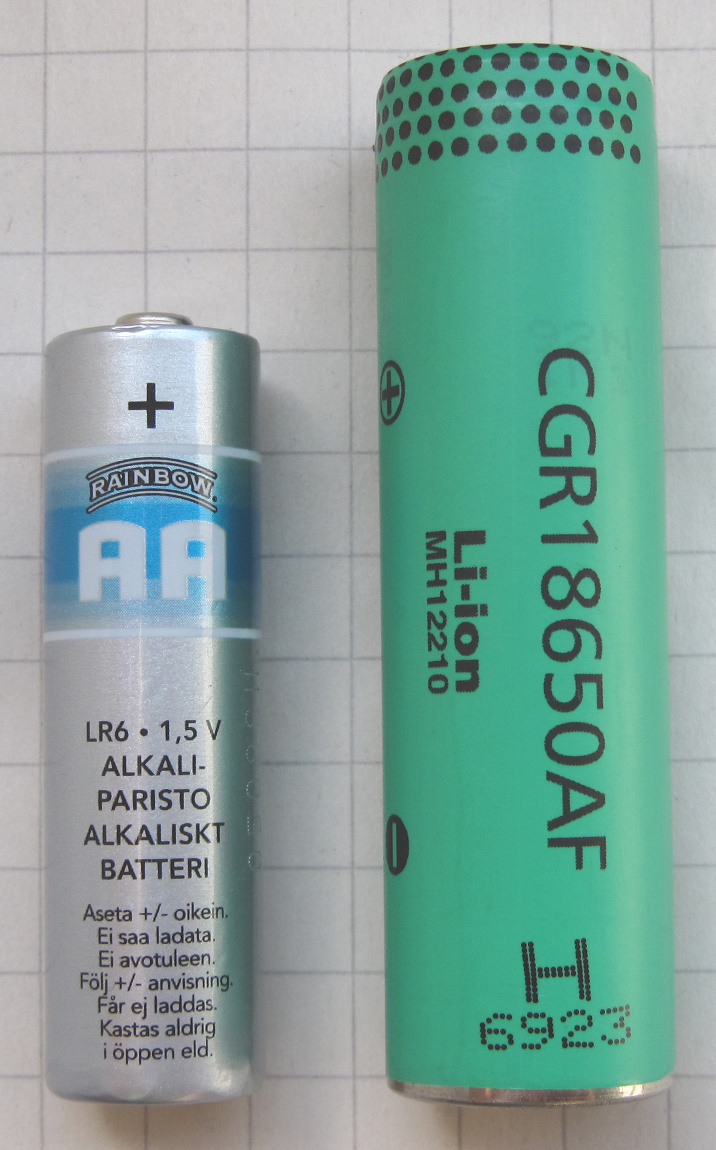
Left: AA alkaline battery. Right: 18650 lithium-ion battery

Lithium-ion batteries are constructed of several key components, including an anode, cathode, separator, casing, electrolyte, and a pair of current collectors.

Typically, the negative electrode of a conventional lithium-ion cell is made from graphite. The positive electrode is typically a metal oxide or phosphate. The electrolyte is a lithium salt in an organic solvent. The negative electrode (which is the anode when the cell is discharging) and the positive electrode (which is the cathode when discharging) are prevented from shorting by a separator. The electrodes are connected to the powered circuit through two pieces of metal called current collectors.

The negative and positive electrodes swap their electrochemical roles (anode and cathode) when the cell is charged. Despite this, in discussions of battery design the negative electrode of a rechargeable cell is often just called "the anode" and the positive electrode "the cathode".

In its fully lithiated state of LiC_{6}, graphite correlates to a theoretical capacity of 1339 coulombs per gram (372 mAh/g). The positive electrode is generally one of three materials: a layered oxide (such as lithium cobalt oxide), a polyanion (such as lithium iron phosphate) or a spinel (such as lithium manganese oxide). More experimental materials include graphene-containing electrodes, although these remain far from commercially viable due to their high cost.

Lithium reacts vigorously with water to form lithium hydroxide (LiOH) and hydrogen gas. Thus, a non-aqueous electrolyte is typically used, and a sealed container rigidly excludes moisture from the battery pack. The non-aqueous electrolyte is typically a mixture of organic carbonates such as ethylene carbonate and propylene carbonate containing complexes of lithium ions. Ethylene carbonate is essential for making solid electrolyte interphase on the carbon anode, but since it is solid at room temperature, a liquid solvent (such as propylene carbonate or diethyl carbonate) is added.

The electrolyte salt is almost always lithium hexafluorophosphate (LiPF_{6}), which combines good ionic conductivity with chemical and electrochemical stability. The hexafluorophosphate anion is essential for passivating the aluminium current collector used for the positive electrode. A titanium tab is ultrasonically welded to the aluminium current collector. Other salts like lithium perchlorate (LiClO_{4}), lithium tetrafluoroborate (LiBF_{4}), and lithium bis(trifluoromethanesulfonyl)imide (LiC_{2}F_{6}NO_{4}S_{2}) are frequently used in research in tab-less coin cells, but are not usable in larger format cells, often because they are not compatible with the aluminium current collector. Copper (with a spot-welded nickel tab) is used as the current collector at the negative electrode.

Current collector design and surface treatments may take various forms: foil, mesh, foam (dealloyed), etched (wholly or selectively), and coated (with various materials) to improve electrical characteristics.

Depending on materials choices, the voltage, energy density, life, and safety of a lithium-ion cell can change dramatically. Current effort has been exploring the use of novel architectures using nanotechnology to improve performance. Areas of interest include nano-scale electrode materials and alternative electrode structures.

The manufacturing of lithium-ion batteries and their components requires the use of cleanrooms. The electrolyte filling and subsequent sealing steps are carried out autonomously inside dry rooms, which are cleanrooms with an extremely low dew point, often below -50 degrees Celsius. This is because electrolytes such as Lithium hexafluorophosphate are highly sensitive to moisture which can reduce lifespan measured in charge cycles or battery capacity. The concentration of H2O in air must be kept below 100 parts per million. Cathode coating, and cell assembly (not battery pack assembly) can also be carried out inside these rooms. The room can be divided into zones with several humidity levels, with the most dry reserved for the electrolyte filling and cell sealing areas, and the others reserved for cathode coating and cell assembly. Dedicated dehumidification units (DHUs) are used to dry the air, which use an absorption process with silica desiccant on a wheel which absorbs humidity from an airstream as it passes through the wheel and then the wheel rotates into another airstream to regenerate the desiccant by drying it with heated air. The rooms have airlocks. These are also known as desiccant dehumidifiers. Personal protective equipment is required to enter the rooms during operation due to the adverse health effects of dry air.

== Electrochemistry ==
The electrochemical reactants in a lithium-ion cell are the materials of the electrodes, both of which are compounds containing lithium atoms. Although many thousands of different materials have been investigated, only a very small number are commercially usable. All commercial Li-ion cells use intercalation compounds as active materials. The negative electrode is usually graphite, although silicon is often mixed in to increase the capacity. The electrolyte is usually lithium hexafluorophosphate, dissolved in a mixture of organic carbonates. A number of different materials are used for the positive electrode, such as LiCoO_{2}, LiFePO_{4}, and lithium nickel manganese cobalt oxides.

During cell discharge the negative electrode is the anode and the positive electrode the cathode: electrons flow from the anode to the cathode through the external circuit. An oxidation half-reaction at the anode produces positively charged lithium ions and negatively charged electrons. The oxidation half-reaction may also produce uncharged material that remains at the anode. Lithium ions move through the electrolyte; electrons move through the external circuit toward the cathode where they recombine with the cathode material in a reduction half-reaction. The electrolyte provides a conductive medium for lithium ions but does not partake in the electrochemical reaction. The reactions during discharge lower the chemical potential of the cell, so discharging transfers energy from the cell to wherever the electric current dissipates its energy, mostly in the external circuit.

During charging these reactions and transports go in the opposite direction: electrons move from the positive electrode to the negative electrode through the external circuit. To charge the cell the external circuit has to provide electrical energy. This energy is then stored as chemical energy in the cell (with some loss, e. g., due to coulombic efficiency lower than 1).

Both electrodes allow lithium ions to move in and out of their structures with a process called insertion (intercalation) or extraction (deintercalation), respectively.

As the lithium ions "rock" back and forth between the two electrodes, these batteries are also known as "rocking-chair batteries" or "swing batteries" (a term given by some European industries).

The following equations exemplify the chemistry (left to right: discharging, right to left: charging).

The negative electrode half-reaction for the graphite is

$$\ce{LiC6 <=> C6 + Li+ + e^-}$$

The positive electrode half-reaction in the lithium-doped cobalt oxide substrate is

$$\ce{CoO2 + Li+ + e- <=> LiCoO2}$$

The full reaction being

$$\ce{LiC6 + CoO2 <=> C6 + LiCoO2}$$

The overall reaction has its limits. Overdischarging supersaturates lithium cobalt oxide, leading to the production of lithium oxide, possibly by the following irreversible reaction:

$$\ce{Li+ + e^- + LiCoO2 -> Li2O + CoO}$$

Overcharging up to 5.2 volts leads to the synthesis of cobalt (IV) oxide, as evidenced by x-ray diffraction:

$$\ce{LiCoO2 -> Li+ + CoO2 + e^-}$$

The cell's energy is equal to the voltage times the charge. Each gram of lithium represents Faraday's constant / 6.941(atomic mass), or 13,901 coulombs. At 3 V, this gives 41.7 kJ per gram of lithium, or 11.6 kWh per kilogram of lithium. This is slightly more than the heat of combustion of gasoline; however, lithium-ion batteries as a whole are still significantly heavier per unit of energy due to the additional materials used in production.

Note that the cell voltages involved in these reactions are larger than the potential at which an aqueous solutions would electrolyze.

== Charging and discharging ==
During discharge, lithium ions (Li^{+}) carry the current within the battery cell from the negative to the positive electrode, through the non-aqueous electrolyte and separator diaphragm.

During charging, an external electrical power source applies an over-voltage (a voltage greater than the cell's own voltage) to the cell, forcing electrons to flow from the positive to the negative electrode. The lithium ions also migrate (through the electrolyte) from the positive to the negative electrode where they become embedded in the porous electrode material in a process known as intercalation.

=== Constant-current constant-voltage charging ===
Constant current constant voltage (CC/CV) is the standard method used to charge lithium-ion cells. During the constant current phase, the charger applies a constant current to the battery at a steadily increasing voltage. Once the maximum charging voltage is reached, the charger changes to the constant voltage phase, where the voltage is held steady and the current gradually decreases, until a minimum current threshold is reached.

If the starting voltage of the cell is too low, a very low charging current is usually used until the voltage reaches a safe level. This is sometimes referred to as trickle charging.

When charging lithium-ion batteries made of multiple cells in series, top-balancing is also often performed.

=== Safety considerations ===
Failure to follow current and voltage limitations can result in excessive coulombic heating of the battery, and in the case of overcharge to voltages higher than designed can lead to an explosion.

Charging temperature limits for Li-ion are stricter than the operating limits. Lithium-ion chemistry performs well at elevated temperatures but prolonged exposure to heat reduces battery life. Li‑ion batteries offer good charging performance at cooler temperatures and may even allow "fast-charging" within a temperature range of 5 to 45 °C (41 to 113 °F). Charging should be performed within this temperature range. At temperatures from 0 to 5 °C charging is possible, but the charge current should be reduced. During a low-temperature (under 0 °C) charge, the slight temperature rise above ambient due to the internal cell resistance is beneficial. High temperatures during charging may lead to battery degradation and charging at temperatures above 45 °C will degrade battery performance, whereas at lower temperatures the internal resistance of the battery may increase, resulting in slower charging and thus longer charging times.

=== Self discharge ===
Batteries gradually self-discharge even if not connected and delivering current. Li-ion rechargeable batteries have a self-discharge rate typically stated by manufacturers to be 1.5–2% per month.

The rate increases with temperature and state of charge. A 2004 study found that for most cycling conditions self-discharge was primarily time-dependent; however, after several months of stand on open circuit or float charge, state-of-charge dependent losses became significant. The self-discharge rate did not increase monotonically with state-of-charge, but dropped somewhat at intermediate states of charge. Self-discharge rates may increase as batteries age. In 1999, self-discharge per month was measured at 8% at 21 °C, 15% at 40 °C, 31% at 60 °C. By 2007, monthly self-discharge rate was estimated at 2% to 3%, and 2–3% by 2016.

By comparison, the self-discharge rate for NiMH batteries dropped, as of 2017, from up to 30% per month for previously common cells to about 0.08–0.33% per month for low self-discharge NiMH batteries, and is about 10% per month in NiCd batteries.

== Battery designs and formats ==
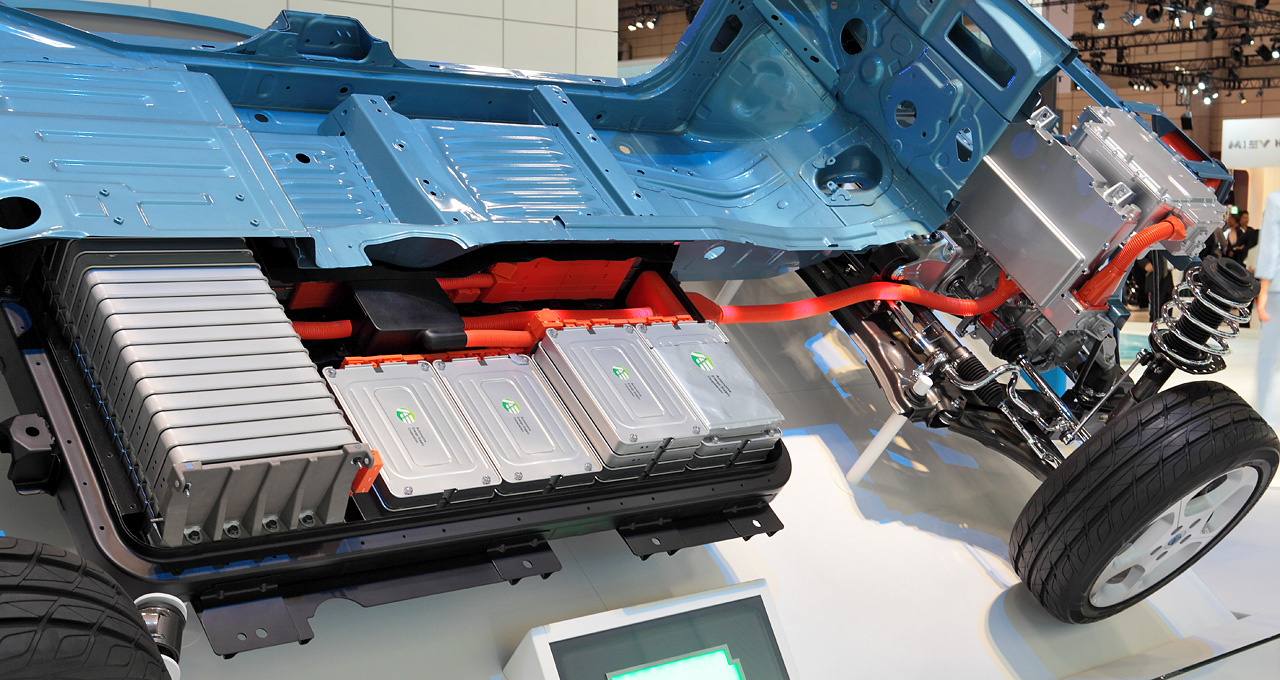
Nissan Leaf's lithium-ion battery pack

Lithium-ion batteries may have multiple levels of structure. Small batteries consist of a single battery cell. Larger batteries connect cells in parallel into a module and connect modules in series and parallel into a pack. Multiple packs may be connected in series to increase the voltage.

Batteries may be equipped with temperature sensors, heating/cooling systems, voltage regulator circuits, voltage taps, and charge-state monitors. These components address safety risks like overheating and short circuiting.

=== Electrode layers and electrolyte ===
On the macrostructral level (length scale 0.1–5 mm) almost all commercial lithium-ion batteries comprise foil current collectors (aluminium for cathode and copper for anode). Copper is selected for the anode, because lithium does not alloy with it. Aluminum is used for the cathode, because it passivates in LiPF_{6} electrolytes.

=== Cells ===
Li-ion cells are available in various form factors, which can generally be divided into four types:

- Coin cells have a rugged design with metal (stainless steel, usually) casing. Because of their poor specific energy (in Wh/kg) and small energy (Wh) per cell, their use is limited to wristwatches, portable calculators, and research. Notably, coin format cells are more commonly used for primary lithium-metal batteries.
- Small cylindrical (solid body without terminals, such as those used in most e-bikes and most electric vehicle battery and older laptop batteries); they typically come in standard sizes.
- Large cylindrical (solid body with large threaded terminals)
- Flat or pouch (soft, flat body, such as those used in cell phones and newer laptops; these are lithium-ion polymer batteries.
- Rigid plastic case with large threaded terminals (such as electric vehicle traction packs)

Cells with a cylindrical shape are made in a characteristic "swiss roll" manner (known as a "jelly roll" in the US), which means it is a single long "sandwich" of the positive electrode, separator, negative electrode, and separator rolled into a single spool. The result is encased in a container. One advantage of cylindrical cells is faster production speed. One disadvantage can be a large radial temperature gradient at high discharge rates.

The absence of a case gives pouch cells the highest gravimetric energy density; however, many applications require containment to prevent expansion when their state of charge (SOC) level is high, and for general structural stability. Both rigid plastic and pouch-style cells are sometimes referred to as prismatic cells due to their rectangular shapes. Three basic battery types are used in 2020s-era electric vehicles: cylindrical cells (e.g., Tesla), prismatic pouch (e.g., from LG), and prismatic can cells (e.g., from LG, Samsung, Panasonic, and others).

Lithium-ion flow batteries have been demonstrated that suspend the cathode or anode material in an aqueous or organic solution.

As of 2014, the smallest Li-ion cell was pin-shaped with a diameter of 3.5 mm and a weight of 0.6 g, made by Panasonic. A coin cell form factor is available for LiCoO_{2} cells, usually designated with a "LiR" prefix.

=== Electrode layers ===
==== Cell voltage ====
The average voltage of LCO (lithium cobalt oxide) chemistry is 3.6 V if made with hard carbon anode and 3.7 V if made with graphite anode. Comparatively, the latter has a flatter discharge voltage curve.

== Uses ==
Beyond powering small electronics and vehicles, the installed capacity of lithium-ion grid battery storage in the US has grown steadily since the 2010s.

Lithium-ion batteries are used in a multitude of applications, including consumer electronics, toys, power tools, electric vehicles and backup power in telecommunications applications. Lithium-ion batteries are also used for grid energy storage.

Some submarines have also been equipped with lithium-ion batteries.

== Performance ==
- Specific energy density: 100 to 250 W·h/kg (360 to 900 kJ/kg)
- Volumetric energy density: 250 to 680 W·h/L (900 to 2230 J/cm^{3})
- Specific power density: 1 to 10,000 W/kg

On average, the price of lithium-ion batteries declined about 19% for each doubling of installed capacity—the technology's "learning rate".

Because lithium-ion batteries can have a variety of positive and negative electrode materials, the energy density and voltage vary accordingly.

The open-circuit voltage is higher than in aqueous batteries (such as lead–acid, nickel–metal hydride and nickel–cadmium). Internal resistance increases with both cycling and age, although this depends strongly on the voltage and temperature the batteries are stored at. Rising internal resistance causes the voltage at the terminals to drop under load, which reduces the maximum current draw. Eventually, increasing resistance will leave the battery in a state such that it can no longer support the normal discharge currents requested of it without unacceptable voltage drop or overheating.

Batteries with a lithium iron phosphate positive and graphite negative electrodes have a nominal open-circuit voltage of 3.2 V and a typical charging voltage of 3.6 V. Lithium nickel manganese cobalt (NMC) oxide positives with graphite negatives have a 3.7 V nominal voltage with a 4.2 V maximum while charging. The charging procedure is performed at constant voltage with current-limiting circuitry (i.e., charging with constant current until a voltage of 4.2 V is reached in the cell and continuing with a constant voltage applied until the current drops close to zero). Typically, the charge is terminated at 3% of the initial charge current. In the past, lithium-ion batteries could not be fast-charged and needed at least two hours to fully charge. Current-generation cells can be fully charged in 45 minutes or less. In 2015 researchers demonstrated a small 600 mAh capacity battery charged to 68 percent capacity in two minutes and a 3,000 mAh battery charged to 48 percent capacity in five minutes. The latter battery has an energy density of 620 W·h/L. The device employed heteroatoms bonded to graphite molecules in the anode.

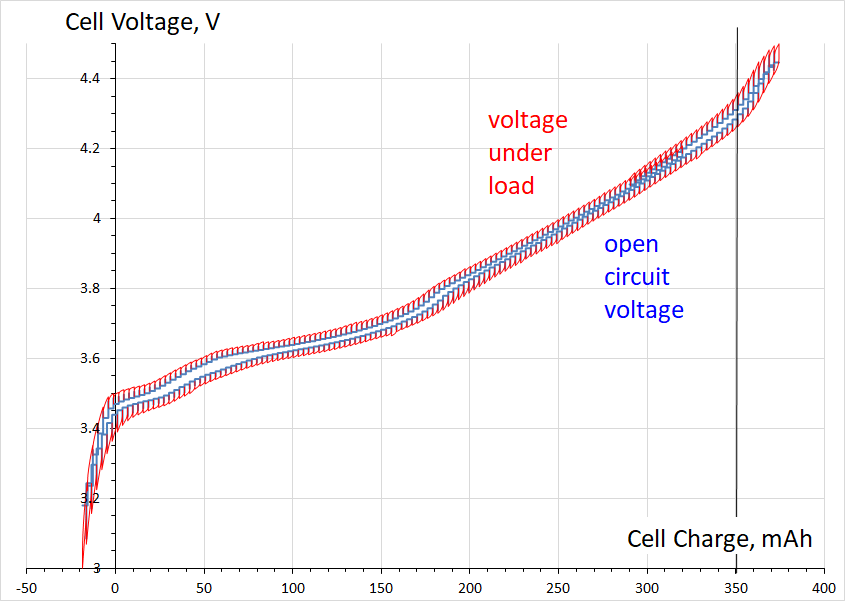
Galvanostatic Intermittent Titration Technique (GITT) data from an AAA(10440) size Li-ion battery

Performance of manufactured batteries has improved over time. For example, from 1991 to 2005 the energy capacity per price of lithium-ion batteries improved more than ten-fold, from 0.3 W·h per dollar to over 3 W·h per dollar. In the period from 2011 to 2017, progress has averaged 7.5% annually. Overall, between 1991 and 2024, prices for all types of lithium-ion cells (in dollars per kWh) fell approximately 99%. From 1991 to 2018, energy density more than tripled. Efforts to increase energy density contributed significantly to cost reduction. Energy density can also be increased by improvements in the chemistry of the cell, for instance, by full or partial replacement of graphite with silicon. Silicon anodes enhanced with graphene nanotubes to eliminate the premature degradation of silicon allow for record-breaking battery energy density of up to 350 Wh/kg and lowering EV prices to be competitive with ICEs.

Differently sized cells of the same format (shape) with the same chemistry may have different energy densities. Jelly roll cells usually have a higher energy density than coin or prismatic cells of the same Ah, because of a tighter/compresses packing of the cell layers. Among cylindrical cells, those with a larger size have a larger energy density, albeit the exact value strongly depends on the thickness of the electrode layers. The disadvantage of large cells is decrease of the heat transfer from the cell to its surroundings.

=== Round-trip efficiency ===
The table below shows the result of an experimental evaluation of a "high-energy" type 3.0 Ah 18650 NMC cell in 2021, round-trip efficiency which compared the energy going into the cell and energy extracted from the cell from 100% (4.2v) SoC to 0% SoC (cut off 2.0v). A round-trip efficiency is the percent of energy that can be used relative to the energy that went into charging the battery.

C rate	efficiency	estimated charge efficiency	estimated discharged efficiency
0.2	86%	93%	92%
0.4	82%	92%	90%
0.6	81%	91%	89%
0.8	77%	90%	86%
1.0	75%	89%	85%
1.2	73%	89%	83%

Characterization of a cell in a different experiment in 2017 reported round-trip efficiency of 85.5% at 2C and 97.6% at 0.1C

== Lifespan ==
A news broadcast about the dangers of lithium battery fires

The lifespan of a lithium-ion battery is typically defined as the number of full charge-discharge cycles to reach a failure threshold in terms of capacity loss or impedance rise. Manufacturers typically specify cycle life as the number of cycles until capacity falls to 80% of its rated value. Simply storing lithium-ion batteries in the charged state also reduces their capacity and increases the cell resistance (primarily due to the continuous growth of the solid electrolyte interface on the anode). Calendar life describes degradation during storage as well as cycling. Battery cycle life is affected by many different stress factors including temperature, discharge current, charge current, and state of charge ranges (depth of discharge). Because batteries in practical applications are usually only partially charged and discharged, researchers sometimes use cumulative discharge or equivalent full cycles, which sum partial cycles into an equivalent number of full charge–discharge cycles. Batteries stored at a high temperature or a high state of charge often lose their capacities more quickly.

Over their lifespan, batteries degrade gradually leading to reduced cyclable charge (a.k.a. Ah capacity) and increased resistance (the latter translates into a lower operating cell voltage).

Several degradation processes occur, some during cycling, some during storage, and some all the time: Degradation is strongly temperature-dependent: degradation at room temperature is minimal but increases for batteries stored or used in high temperature (usually > 35 °C) or low temperature (usually < 5 °C) environments. Also, battery life in room temperature is maximal. High charge levels also hasten capacity loss. Frequent charge to > 90% and discharge to < 10% may also hasten capacity loss. Keeping the li-ion battery status to about 60% to 80% can reduce the capacity loss.

In a study, scientists provided 3D imaging and model analysis to reveal main causes, mechanics, and potential mitigations of the problematic degradation of the batteries over charge cycles. They found "[p]article cracking increases and contact loss between particles and carbon-binder domain are observed to correlate with the cell degradation" and indicates that "the reaction heterogeneity within the thick cathode caused by the unbalanced electron conduction is the main cause of the battery degradation over cycling".

The most common degradation mechanisms include:

1. Reduction of the organic carbonate electrolyte at the anode, which results in the growth of Solid Electrolyte Interface (SEI), where Li^{+} ions get irreversibly trapped, i.e. loss of lithium inventory. This shows as increased ohmic impedance of the negative electrode and a drop in the cyclable Ah charge. At constant temperature, the SEI film thickness (and therefore, the SEI resistance and the loss in cyclable Li^{+}) increases as a square root of the time spent in the charged state. The number of cycles is not a useful metric in characterizing this degradation pathway. Under high temperatures or in the presence of a mechanical damage the electrolyte reduction can proceed explosively.
2. Lithium metal plating also results in the loss of lithium inventory (cyclable Ah charge), as well as internal short-circuiting and ignition of a battery. Once Li plating commences during cycling, it results in larger slopes of capacity loss per cycle and resistance increase per cycle. This degradation mechanism become more prominent during fast charging and low temperatures.
3. Loss of the (negative or positive) electroactive materials due to dissolution (e.g. of Mn^{3+} species), cracking, exfoliation, detachment or even simple regular volume change during cycling. It shows up as both charge and power fade (increased resistance). Both positive and negative electrode materials are subject to fracturing due to the volumetric strain of repeated (de)lithiation cycles.
4. Structural degradation of cathode materials, such as Li^{+}/Ni^{2+} cation mixing in nickel-rich materials. This manifests as "electrode saturation", loss of cyclable Ah charge and as a "voltage fade".
5. Other material degradations. Negative copper current collector is particularly prone to corrosion/dissolution at low cell voltages. PVDF binder also degrades, causing the detachment of the electroactive materials, and the loss of cyclable Ah charge.

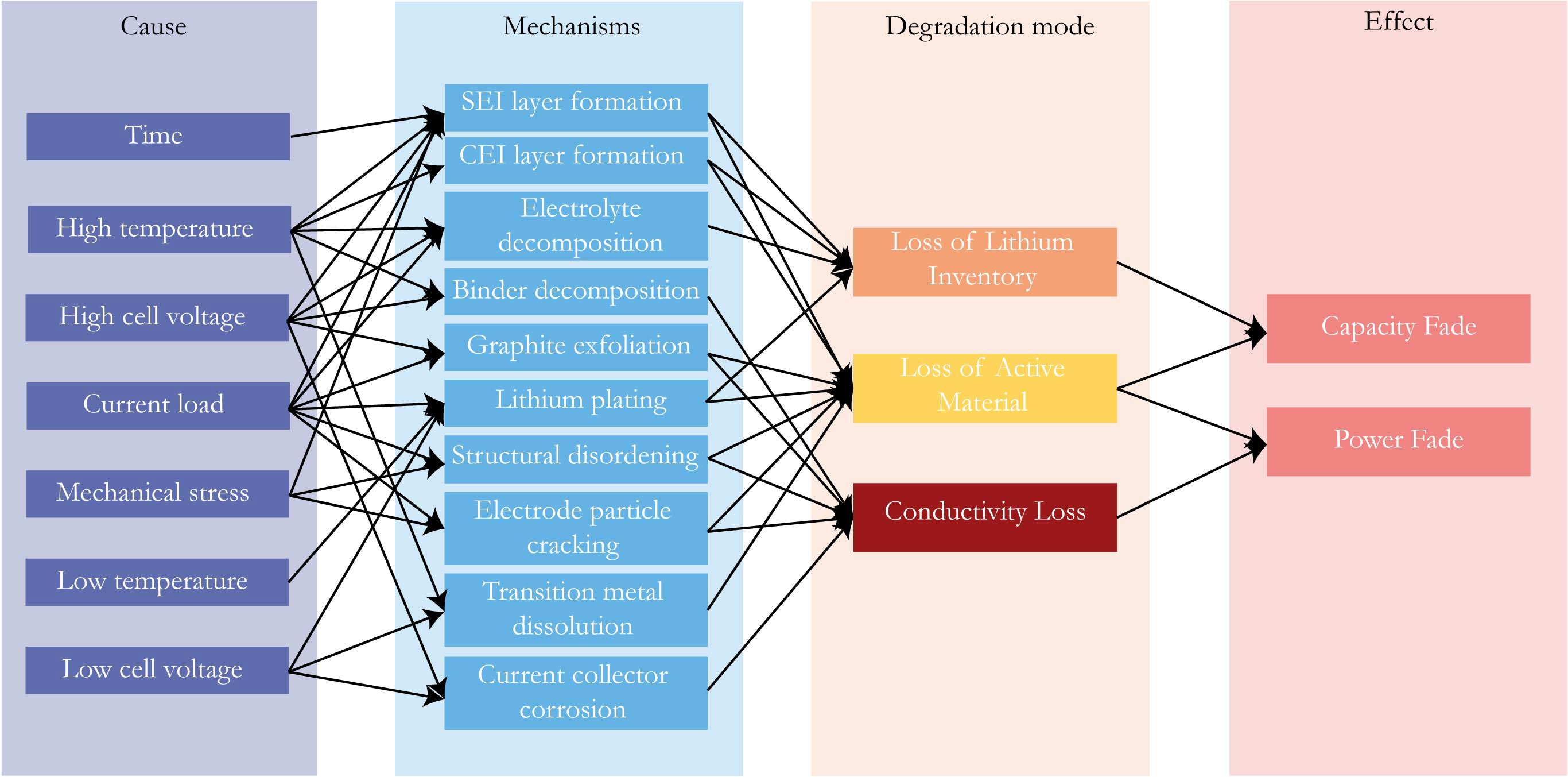
Overview of the correlation between operational stress factors (the causes for degradation), the corresponding aging mechanisms, aging mode, and their effect on lithium-ion battery aging

These are shown in the figure on the right. A change from one main degradation mechanism to another appears as a knee (slope change) in the capacity vs. cycle number plot.

Most studies of lithium-ion battery aging have been done at elevated (50–60 °C) temperatures for accelerated aging. Under these storage conditions, fully charged nickel-cobalt-aluminum and lithium-iron phosphate cells lose ca. 20% of their cyclable charge in 1–2 years. It is believed that the aforementioned anode aging is the most important degradation pathway in these cases. On the other hand, manganese-based cathodes show a (ca. 20–50%) faster degradation under these conditions, probably due to the additional mechanism of Mn ion dissolution. At 25 °C the degradation of lithium-ion batteries seems to follow the same pathway(s) as the degradation at 50 °C, but with half the speed. In other words, based on the limited extrapolated experimental data, lithium-ion batteries are expected to lose irreversibly around 20% of their cyclable charge in 3–5 years or 1000–2000 cycles at 25 °C. Lithium-ion batteries with titanate anodes do not suffer from SEI growth, and last longer (>5000 cycles) than graphite anodes. However, in complete cells other degradation mechanisms (i.e. the dissolution of Mn^{3+} and the Ni^{2+}/Li^{+} place exchange, decomposition of PVDF binder and particle detachment) show up after 1000–2000 days, and the use titanate anode does not improve full cell durability in practice.

=== Detailed degradation description ===
A more detailed description of some of these mechanisms is provided below:

1. The negative (anode) SEI layer, a passivation coating formed by electrolyte (such as ethylene carbonate, dimethyl carbonate but not propylene carbonate) reduction products, is essential for providing Li^{+} ion conduction, while preventing electron transfer (and, thus, further solvent reduction). Under typical operating conditions, the negative SEI layer reaches a fixed thickness after the first few charges (formation cycles), allowing the device to operate for years. However, at elevated temperatures or due to mechanical detachment of the negative SEI, this exothermic electrolyte reduction can proceed violently and lead to an explosion via several reactions. Lithium-ion batteries are prone to capacity fading over hundreds to thousands of cycles. Formation of the SEI consumes lithium ions, reducing the overall charge and discharge efficiency of the electrode material. as a decomposition product, various SEI-forming additives can be added to the electrolyte to promote the formation of a more stable SEI that remains selective for lithium ions to pass through while blocking electrons. Cycling cells at high temperature or at fast rates can promote the degradation of Li-ion batteries due in part to the degradation of the SEI or lithium plating. Charging Li-ion batteries beyond 80% can drastically accelerate battery degradation. Depending on the electrolyte and additives, common components of the SEI layer that forms on the anode include a mixture of lithium oxide, lithium fluoride and semicarbonates (e.g., lithium alkyl carbonates). At elevated temperatures, alkyl carbonates in the electrolyte decompose into insoluble species such as Li_{2}CO_{3} that increases the film thickness. This increases cell impedance and reduces cycling capacity. Gases formed by electrolyte decomposition can increase the cell's internal pressure and are a potential safety issue in demanding environments such as mobile devices. Below 25 °C, plating of metallic lithium on the anodes and subsequent reaction with the electrolyte is leading to loss of cyclable lithium. Extended storage can trigger an incremental increase in film thickness and capacity loss. Charging at greater than 4.2 V can initiate Li^{+} plating on the anode, producing irreversible capacity loss. Electrolyte degradation mechanisms include hydrolysis and thermal decomposition. At concentrations as low as 10 ppm, water begins catalyzing a number of degradation products that can affect the electrolyte, anode and cathode. LiPF_{6} participates in an equilibrium reaction with LiF and PF_{5}. Under typical conditions, the equilibrium lies far to the left. However the presence of water generates substantial LiF, an insoluble, electrically insulating product. LiF binds to the anode surface, increasing film thickness. LiPF_{6} hydrolysis yields PF_{5}, a strong Lewis acid that reacts with electron-rich species, such as water. PF_{5} reacts with water to form hydrofluoric acid (HF) and phosphorus oxyfluoride. Phosphorus oxyfluoride in turn reacts to form additional HF and difluorohydroxy phosphoric acid. HF converts the rigid SEI film into a fragile one. On the cathode, the carbonate solvent can then diffuse onto the cathode oxide over time, releasing heat and potentially causing thermal runaway. Decomposition of electrolyte salts and interactions between the salts and solvent start at as low as 70 °C. Significant decomposition occurs at higher temperatures. At 85 °C transesterification products, such as dimethyl-2,5-dioxahexane carboxylate (DMDOHC) are formed from EC reacting with DMC. Batteries generate heat when being charged or discharged, especially at high currents. Large battery packs, such as those used in electric vehicles, are generally equipped with thermal management systems that maintain a temperature between 15 °C (59 °F) and 35 °C (95 °F). Pouch and cylindrical cell temperatures depend linearly on the discharge current. Poor internal ventilation may increase temperatures. For large batteries consisting of multiple cells, non-uniform temperatures can lead to non-uniform and accelerated degradation. In contrast, the calendar life of LiFePO_{4} cells is not affected by high charge states. Positive SEI layer in lithium-ion batteries is much less understood than the negative SEI. It is believed to have a low-ionic conductivity and shows up as an increased interfacial resistance of the cathode during cycling and calendar aging.
2. Lithium plating is a phenomenon in which certain conditions lead to metallic lithium forming and depositing onto the surface of the battery's anode rather than intercalating within the anode material's structure. Low temperatures, overcharging and high charging rates can exacerbate this occurrence. During these conditions, lithium ions may not intercalate uniformly into the anode material and form layers of lithium ion on the surface in the form of dendrites. Lithium dendrites are tiny needle-like structures that can accumulate and pierce the separator, causing a short circuit can initiate thermal runaway. This cascade of rapid and uncontrolled energy can lead to battery swelling, increased heat, fires and or explosions. Additionally, this dendritic growth can lead to side reactions with the electrolyte and convert the fresh plated lithium into electrochemically inert dead lithium. Moreover, the dendritic growth brought on by lithium plating can degrade the lithium-ion battery and lead to poor cycling efficiency and safety hazards. Some ways to mitigate lithium plating and the dendritic growth is by controlling the temperature, optimizing the charging conditions, and improving the materials used. In terms of temperature, the ideal charging temperature is anywhere between 0 °C to 45 °C, but also room temperature is ideal (20 °C to 25 °C). Advancements in materials innovation requires much research and development in the electrolyte selection and improving the anode resistance to plating. One such materials innovation would be to add other compounds to the electrolyte like fluoroethylene carbonate (FEC) to form a rich LiF SEI. Another novel method would be to coat the separator in a protective shield that essentially "kills" the lithium ions before it can form these dendrites.
3. Certain manganese containing cathodes can degrade by the Hunter degradation mechanism resulting in manganese dissolution and reduction on the anode. By the Hunter mechanism for LiMn_{2}O_{4}, hydrofluoric acid catalyzes the loss of manganese through disproportionation of a surface trivalent manganese to form a tetravalent manganese and a soluble divalent manganese:
  2Mn^{3+} → Mn^{2+}+ Mn^{4+}
  Material loss of the spinel results in capacity fade. Temperatures as low as 50 °C initiate Mn^{2+}deposition on the anode as metallic manganese with the same effects as lithium and copper plating. Cycling over the theoretical max and min voltage plateaus destroys the crystal lattice via Jahn-Teller distortion, which occurs when Mn^{4+} is reduced to Mn^{3+} during discharge. Storage of a battery charged to greater than 3.6 V initiates electrolyte oxidation by the cathode and induces SEI layer formation on the cathode. As with the anode, excessive SEI formation forms an insulator resulting in capacity fade and uneven current distribution. Storage at less than 2 V results in the slow degradation of LiCoO_{2} and LiMn_{2}O_{4} cathodes, the release of oxygen and irreversible capacity loss.
4. Discharging below 2 V can also result in the dissolution of the copper anode current collector and, thus, in catastrophic internal short-circuiting on recharge.

=== Recommendations ===
The IEEE standard 1188–1996 recommends replacing lithium-ion batteries in an electric vehicle, when their charge capacity drops to 80% of the nominal value. In what follows, we shall use the 20% capacity loss as a comparison point between different studies. We shall note, nevertheless, that the linear model of degradation (the constant % of charge loss per cycle or per calendar time) is not always applicable, and that a "knee point", observed as a change of the slope, and related to the change of the main degradation mechanism, is often observed.

== Safety ==
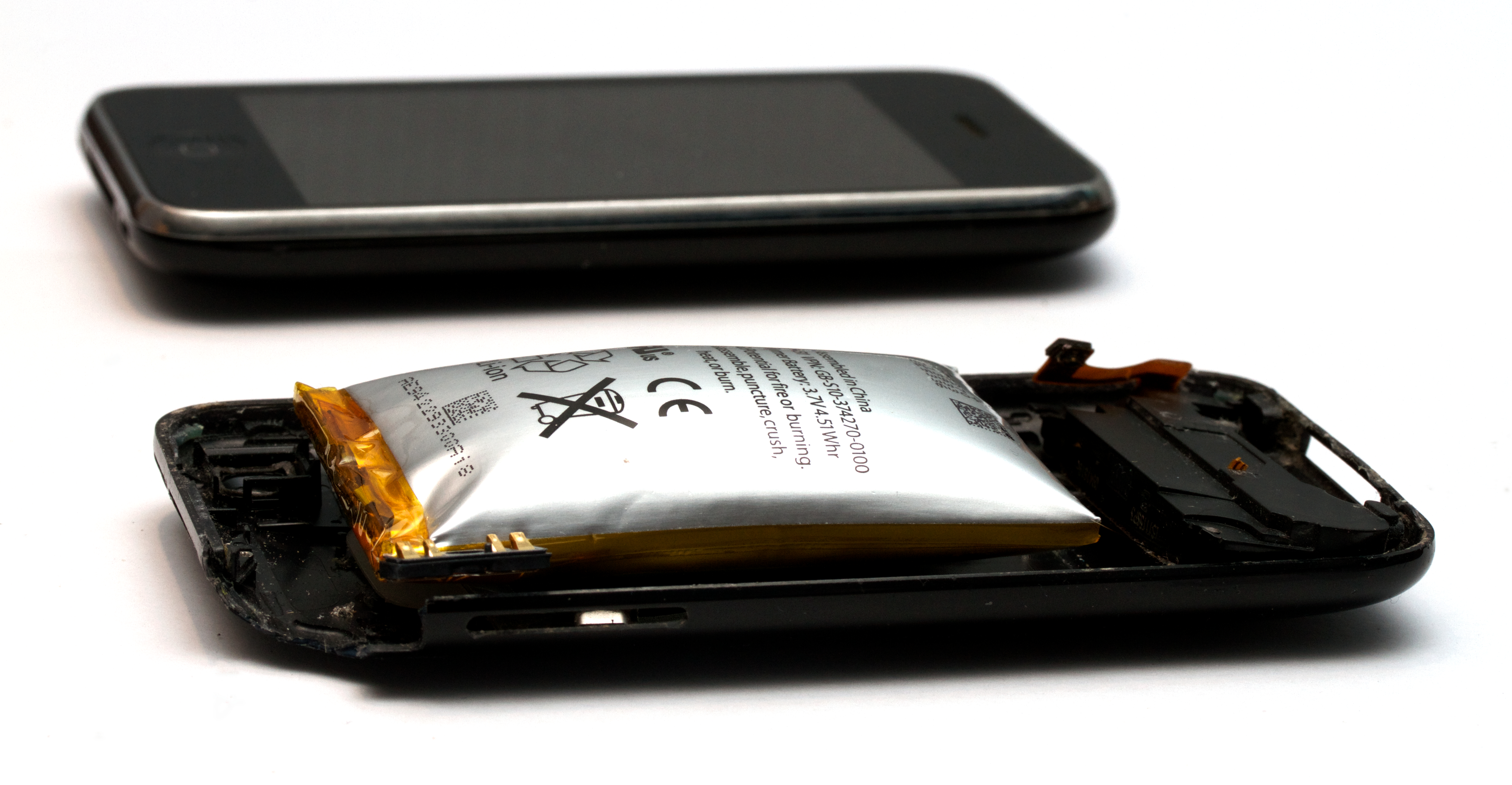
An Apple iPhone 3GS, opened to show a damaged, swollen battery, known colloquially as a "spicy pillow". A second, unopened phone is in the background for comparison.

The problem of lithium-ion battery safety was recognized even before they were first commercially released in 1991. The two main reasons for lithium-ion battery fires and explosions are related to processes on the negative electrode (anode when discharging, cathode when charging). During a normal battery charge lithium ions intercalate into graphite. However, if the charge is too fast or the temperature is too low, lithium metal starts plating on the negative electrode, and the resulting dendrites can penetrate the battery separator, internally short-circuit the cell, and result in high electric current, heating and ignition. In other mechanisms, an explosive reaction between the negative electrode material (LiC_{6}) and the solvent (liquid organic carbonate) occurs even at open circuit, provided that the electrode temperature exceeds a certain threshold above 70°C.

Lithium-ion batteries in the 18650 format or larger may incorporate safety mechanisms such as a current interrupt device (CID) and a positive temperature coefficient (PTC) device. The CID consists of two metal disks in electrical contact. When internal pressure increases, the disks separate, breaking the circuit and terminating the current. The PTC device is composed of a conductive polymer; an increase in current causes the polymer to heat, increasing its electrical resistance and reducing the current flow.

=== Fire hazard ===
Lithium-ion batteries can be a safety hazard since they contain a flammable electrolyte and may become pressurized if they become damaged. A battery cell charged too quickly could cause a short circuit, leading to overheating, explosions, and fires. A Li-ion battery fire can be started due to

1. thermal abuse, e.g. poor cooling or external fire,
2. electrical abuse, e.g. overcharge or external short circuit,
3. mechanical abuse, e.g. penetration or crash, or
4. internal short circuit, e.g. due to manufacturing flaws or aging.

Because of these risks, testing standards are more stringent than those for acid-electrolyte batteries, requiring both a broader range of test conditions and additional battery-specific tests, and there are shipping limitations imposed by safety regulators. There have been battery-related recalls by some companies, including the 2016 Samsung Galaxy Note 7 recall for battery fires.

Lithium-ion batteries have a flammable liquid electrolyte. A faulty battery can cause a serious fire. Faulty chargers can affect the safety of the battery because they can destroy the battery's protection circuit. While charging at temperatures below 0 °C, the negative electrode of the cells gets plated with pure lithium, which can compromise the safety of the whole pack.

Short-circuiting a battery will cause the cell to overheat and possibly to catch fire. Smoke from thermal runaway in a Li-ion battery is both flammable and toxic. Batteries are tested according to the UL 9540A fire standard, and the TS-800 standard also tests fire propagation from one battery container to adjacent containers.

Around 2010, large lithium-ion batteries were introduced in place of other chemistries to power systems on some aircraft; as of January 2014, there had been at least four serious lithium-ion battery fires, or smoke, on the Boeing 787 passenger aircraft, introduced in 2011, which did not cause crashes but had the potential to do so. UPS Airlines Flight 6 crashed in Dubai after its payload of lithium batteries spontaneously ignited during flight and severely damaged crucial systems of the aircraft.

To reduce fire hazards, research projects are intended to develop non-flammable electrolytes.

=== Damaging and overloading ===
If a lithium-ion battery is damaged, crushed, or subjected to a higher electrical load without having overcharge protection, problems may arise. External short circuit can trigger a battery explosion. Such incidents can occur when lithium-ion batteries are not disposed of through the appropriate channels, but are thrown away with other waste. The way they are treated by recycling companies can damage them and cause fires, which in turn can lead to large-scale conflagrations. Twelve such fires were recorded in Swiss recycling facilities in 2023.

If overheated or overcharged, Li-ion batteries may suffer thermal runaway and cell rupture. During thermal runaway, internal degradation and oxidization processes can keep cell temperatures above 500 °C, with the possibility of igniting secondary combustibles, as well as leading to leakage, explosion or fire in extreme cases. To reduce these risks, many lithium-ion cells (and battery packs) contain fail-safe circuitry that disconnects the battery when its voltage is outside the safe range of 3–4.2 V per cell, or when overcharged or discharged. Lithium battery packs, whether constructed by a vendor or the end-user, without effective battery management circuits are susceptible to these issues. Poorly designed or implemented battery management circuits also may cause problems; it is difficult to be certain that any particular battery management circuitry is properly implemented.

=== Voltage limits ===
Lithium-ion cells are susceptible to stress by voltage ranges outside of safe ones between 2.5 and 3.65/4.1/4.2 or 4.35 V (depending on the components of the cell). Exceeding this voltage range results in premature aging and in safety risks due to the reactive components in the cells. When stored for long periods the small current draw of the protection circuitry may drain the battery below its shutoff voltage; normal chargers may then be useless since the battery management system (BMS) may retain a record of this battery (or charger) "failure". Many types of lithium-ion cells cannot be charged safely below 0 °C, as this can result in plating of lithium on the anode of the cell, which may cause complications such as internal short-circuit paths.

Other safety features are required in each cell:

- Shut-down separator (for overheating)
- Tear-away tab (for internal pressure relief)
- Vent (pressure relief in case of severe outgassing)
- Thermal interrupt (overcurrent/overcharging/environmental exposure)

These features are required because the negative electrode produces heat during use, while the positive electrode may produce oxygen. However, these additional devices occupy space inside the cells, add points of failure, and may irreversibly disable the cell when activated. Further, these features increase costs compared to nickel metal hydride batteries, which require only a hydrogen/oxygen recombination device and a back-up pressure valve. Contaminants inside the cells can defeat these safety devices. Also, these features cannot be applied to all kinds of cells; prismatic high-current cells cannot be equipped with a vent or thermal interrupt. High-current cells must not produce excessive heat or oxygen, lest there be a failure, possibly violent. Instead, they must be equipped with internal thermal fuses which act before the anode and cathode reach their thermal limits.

Replacing the lithium cobalt oxide positive electrode material with a lithium metal phosphate such as lithium iron phosphate (LFP) improves cycle counts, shelf life and safety, but lowers capacity. As of 2006, these safer lithium-ion batteries were mainly used in electric cars and other large-capacity battery applications, where safety is critical. In 2016, an LFP-based energy storage system was chosen to be installed in Paiyun Lodge on Mt.Jade (Yushan) (the highest lodge in Taiwan). As of June 2024, the system was still operating safely.

=== Recalls ===
In 2006, approximately 10 million Sony batteries used in laptops were recalled, including those in laptops from Dell, Sony, Apple, Lenovo, Panasonic, Toshiba, Hitachi, Fujitsu and Sharp. The batteries were found to be susceptible to internal contamination by metal particles during manufacture. Under some circumstances, these particles could pierce the separator, causing a dangerous short circuit.

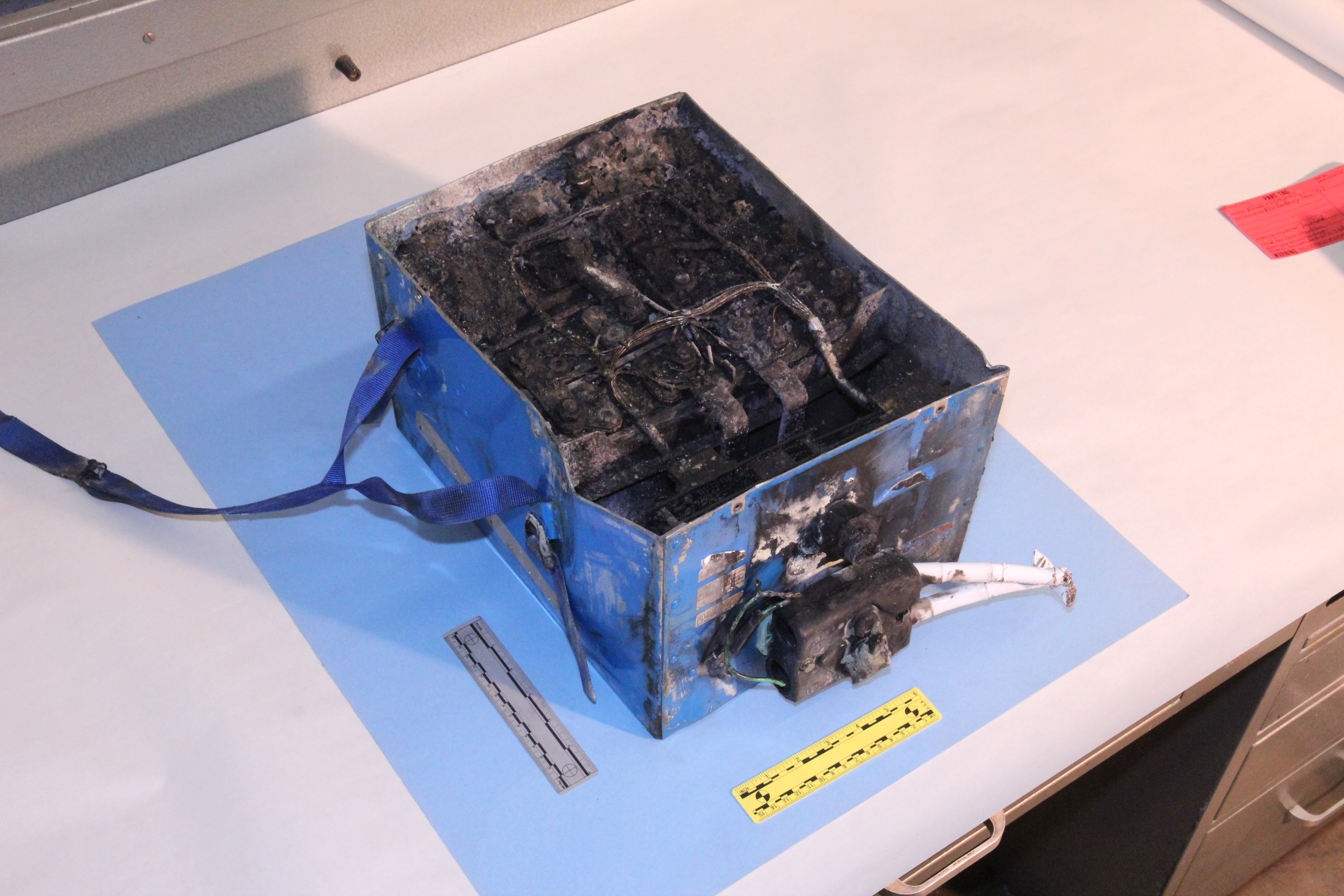
Japan Airlines Boeing 787 lithium cobalt oxide battery that caught fire in 2013

Transport Class 9A:Lithium batteries

IATA estimates that over a billion lithium metal and lithium-ion cells are flown each year. Some kinds of lithium batteries may be prohibited aboard aircraft because of the fire hazard. Some postal administrations restrict air shipping (including EMS) of lithium and lithium-ion batteries, either separately or installed in equipment.

=== Non-flammable electrolyte ===
In 2023, most commercial Li-ion batteries employed alkylcarbonate solvents to assure the formation solid electrolyte interface on the negative electrode. Since such solvents are readily flammable, there has been active research to replace them with non-flammable solvents or to add fire suppressants. Another source of hazard is hexafluorophosphate anion, which is needed to passivate the negative current collector made of aluminium. Hexafluorophosphate reacts with water and releases volatile and toxic hydrogen fluoride.

Several strategies have been explored for developing non-flammable Li-ion battery electrolytes. One approach uses fluorinated (co-)solvents, such as methyl-(2,2,2-trifluoroethyl)-carbonate (FEMC) or methyl-3,3,3-trifluoropropionate (MTFP). Another approach uses fluorinated anions, such as lithium bis(trifluoromethanesulfonyl)imide or lithium difluoro(oxalato)borate in high concentrations.

== Supply chain ==
As of 2021, almost 90% of raw lithium extraction originated from three countries: Australia (53%), Chile (24%), and China (10%), with almost all production coming from China (56%), Chile (32%) and Argentina (11%).

=== Environmental impact ===
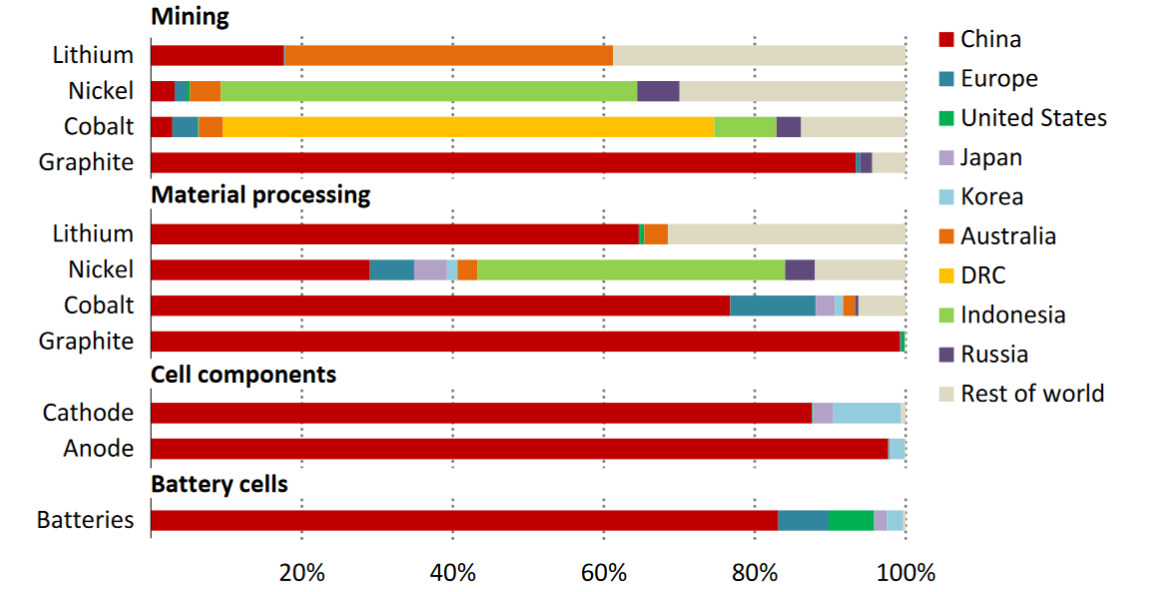
Geographical distribution of the global battery supply chain in 2024

Extraction of lithium, nickel, and cobalt, manufacture of solvents, and mining byproducts present significant environmental and health hazards. Lithium extraction can be fatal to aquatic life due to water pollution. It is known to cause surface water contamination, drinking water contamination, respiratory problems, ecosystem degradation and landscape damage. It also leads to unsustainable water consumption in arid regions (1.9 million liters per ton of lithium). Massive byproduct generation of lithium extraction also presents unsolved problems, such as large amounts of magnesium and lime waste.

Lithium mining takes place in North and South America, Asia, South Africa, Australia, and China.

A 2024 review of research on mining metals used in lithium-ion batteries found that exposure to cobalt and nickel was frequently associated with respiratory health problems, while manganese mining was associated with neurological effects. The review covered 183 studies and found evidence of a multitude of health risks associated with occupational and environmental exposure to these metals.

Cobalt for Li-ion batteries is largely mined in the Congo (see also Mining industry of the Democratic Republic of the Congo). Open-pit cobalt mining has led to deforestation and habitat destruction in the Democratic Republic of Congo.

Open-pit nickel mining has led to environmental degradation and pollution in developing countries such as the Philippines and Indonesia. In 2024, nickel mining and processing was one of the main causes of deforestation in Indonesia.

Manufacturing a kg of Li-ion battery takes about 67 megajoules (MJ) of energy. The global warming potential of lithium-ion batteries manufacturing strongly depends on the energy source used in mining and manufacturing operations, and is difficult to estimate, but one 2019 study estimated 73 kg CO2e/kWh. Effective recycling can reduce the carbon footprint of the production significantly.

The environmental benefits of recycling lithium-ion batteries heavily depend on the exact materials that are being recovered and the energy that is required for processing it. Recycling can strongly reduce the need to refine and extract new raw materials, which can potentially lower greenhouse gas emissions that are commonly associated with battery production. However, it is very important to note that the size of these benefits varies significantly with the technology and the energy sources that are being used in the process.

=== Solid waste and recycling ===
The Li-ion battery recycling rate is often misconstrued to be 5%, in reality, insufficient research exists to determine the exact figure. The European Union estimates 49% of portable batteries sold were collected for recycling in 2023, whilst the UK estimates 45% as of 2026. EU Regulation 2023/1542 requires the recycling of lithium-based batteries to reach a recycling efficiency of 70% by average weight by the end of 2030, and all battery recycling to recover at least 80% of lithium and 95% of cobalt, copper, lead and nickel by the end of 2031; however, no recycled lithium has re-entered the EU as of 2023. These measures aim to aid sustainability efforts and reduce pressure on raw material extraction, as demand for lithium and cobalt is expected to increase 8-fold by 2040, far exceeding current production capabilities. Most research focuses on the recovery of active materials, especially lithium which is a critical raw material; however, through advanced recycling techniques and more sustainable design considerations, electrolytes, binders, and separators can also be recycled.

Recycling lithium-ion batteries presents many challenges due to the variation in size, design, and its chemical composition. These differences can make it extremely difficult to develop one singular recycling process that is able to work efficiently for all battery types. Recycling methods can also involve trade-offs between energy use, the recovery of materials, cost, energy use, as well as environmental impact. Researchers have continued to investigate ways that improve the recovery of valuable materials while still reducing these drawbacks.

Recycling is a multi-step process, starting with the storage of batteries before disposal, followed by manual testing, disassembling, and finally the chemical separation of battery components. Re-use of the battery is preferred over complete recycling as there is less embodied energy in the process. As these batteries are a lot more reactive than classical vehicle waste like tire rubber, there are significant risks to stockpiling used batteries.

The design of lithium-ion battery packs can affect how easily they are able to be dismantled for recycling. Welded connections, adhesives, and other forms of fastening methods can make it difficult to separate the battery components. Designing batteries that are easily able to be dismantled can reduce the processing time and can help recyclers recover materials with greater purity.

==== Pyrometallurgical recovery ====
The pyrometallurgical method uses a high-temperature furnace to reduce the components of the metal oxides in the battery to an alloy of Co, Cu, Fe, and Ni. This is the most common and commercially established method of recycling and can be combined with other similar batteries to increase smelting efficiency and improve thermodynamics. The metal current collectors aid the smelting process, allowing whole cells or modules to be melted at once. The product of this method is a collection of metallic alloy, slag, and gas. At high temperatures, the polymers used to hold the battery cells together burn off and the metal alloy can be separated through a hydrometallurgical process into its separate components. The slag can be further refined or used in the cement industry. The process is relatively risk-free and the exothermic reaction from polymer combustion reduces the required input energy. However, in the process, the plastics, electrolytes, and lithium salts will be lost.

==== Hydrometallurgical metals reclamation ====
This method involves the use of aqueous solutions to remove the desired metals from the cathode. The most common reagent is sulfuric acid. Factors that affect the leaching rate include the concentration of the acid, time, temperature, solid-to-liquid-ratio, and reducing agent. It is experimentally proven that H_{2}O_{2} acts as a reducing agent to speed up the rate of leaching through the reaction:

2 LiCoO_{2} _{(s)} + 3 H_{2}SO_{4} + H_{2}O_{2} → 2 CoSO_{4} _{(aq)} + Li_{2}SO_{4} + 4 H_{2}O + O_{2}

Once leached, the metals can be extracted through precipitation reactions controlled by changing the pH level of the solution. Cobalt, the most expensive metal, can then be recovered in the form of sulfate, oxalate, hydroxide, or carbonate. Recycling methods experiment with the direct reproduction of the cathode from the leached metals. In these procedures, concentrations of the various leached metals are premeasured to match the target cathode and then the cathodes are directly synthesized.

The main issues with this method, however, are the large volume of solvent required and the high cost of neutralization. Although it is easy to shred up the battery, mixing the cathode and anode at the beginning complicates the process, so they will also need to be separated. Unfortunately, the current design of batteries makes the process extremely complex and it is difficult to separate the metals in a closed-loop battery system. Shredding and dissolving may occur at different locations.

==== Direct recycling ====
Direct recycling is the removal of the cathode or anode from the electrode, which are then reconditioned and reused in a new battery. Mixed metal-oxides can be added to the new electrode with very little change to the crystal morphology. The process generally involves the addition of new lithium to replenish the loss of lithium in the cathode due to degradation from cycling. Cathode strips are obtained from the dismantled batteries, then soaked in NMP, and undergo sonication to remove excess deposits. It is treated hydrothermally with a solution containing LiOH/Li_{2}SO_{4} before annealing.

This method is extremely cost-effective for noncobalt-based batteries as the raw materials do not make up the bulk of the cost. Direct recycling avoids the time-consuming and expensive purification steps, which is great for low-cost cathodes such as LiMn_{2}O_{4} and LiFePO_{4}. For these cheaper cathodes, most of the cost, embedded energy, and carbon footprint is associated with the manufacturing rather than the raw material. It is experimentally shown that direct recycling can reproduce similar properties to pristine graphite.

The drawback of the method lies in the condition of the retired battery. In the case where the battery is relatively healthy, direct recycling can cheaply restore its properties. However, for batteries where the state of charge is low, direct recycling may not be worth the investment. The process must also be tailored to the specific cathode composition, and therefore the process must be configured to one type of battery at a time. Lastly, in a time with rapidly developing battery technology, the design of a battery today may no longer be desirable a decade from now, rendering direct recycling ineffective.

==== Physical materials separation ====
Physical materials separation recovered materials by mechanical crushing and exploiting physical properties of different components such as particle size, density, ferromagnetism and hydrophobicity. Copper, aluminum and steel casing can be recovered by sorting. The remaining materials, called "black mass", which is composed of nickel, cobalt, lithium and manganese, need a secondary treatment to recover.

==== Biological metals reclamation ====
For the biological metals reclamation or bio-leaching, the process uses microorganisms to digest metal oxides selectively. Then, recyclers can reduce these oxides to produce metal nanoparticles. Although bio-leaching has been used successfully in the mining industry, this process is still nascent to the recycling industry and plenty of opportunities exists for further investigation.

==== Electrolyte recycling ====
Electrolyte recycling consists of two phases. The collection phase extracts the electrolyte from the spent Li-ion battery. This can be achieved through mechanical processes, distillation, freezing, solvent extraction, and supercritical fluid extraction. Due to the volatility, flammability, and sensitivity of the electrolyte, the collection process poses a greater difficulty than the collection process for other components of a Li-ion battery. The next phase consists of separation/electrolyte regeneration. Separation consists of isolating the individual components of the electrolyte. This approach is often used for the direct recovery of the Li salts from the organic solvents. In contrast, regeneration of the electrolyte aims to preserve the electrolyte composition by removing impurities which can be achieved through filtration methods.

The recycling of the electrolytes, which consists 10–15 wt.% of the Li-ion battery, provides both economic and environmental benefits. These benefits include the recovery of the valuable Li-based salts and the prevention of hazardous compounds, such as volatile organic compounds (VOCs) and carcinogens, being released into the environment.

Compared to electrode recycling, less focus is placed on recycling the electrolyte of Li-ion batteries due to lower economic benefits and greater process challenges. Such challenges can include the difficulty associated with recycling different electrolyte compositions, removing side products accumulated from electrolyte decomposition during its runtime, and removal of electrolyte adsorbed onto the electrodes. Due to these challenges, current pyrometallurgical methods of Li-ion battery recycling forgo electrolyte recovery, releasing hazardous gases upon heating. However, due to high energy consumption and environmental impact, future recycling methods are being directed away from this approach.

=== Human rights impact ===
Extraction of raw materials for lithium-ion batteries may present dangers to local people, especially land-based indigenous populations.

Cobalt sourced from the Democratic Republic of the Congo is often mined by workers using hand tools with few safety precautions, resulting in frequent injuries and deaths. Pollution from these mines has exposed people to toxic chemicals that health officials believe to cause birth defects and breathing difficulties. Human rights activists have alleged, and investigative journalism reported confirmation, that child labor is used in these mines.

A study of relationships between lithium extraction companies and indigenous peoples in Argentina indicated that the state may not have protected indigenous peoples' right to free prior and informed consent, and that extraction companies generally controlled community access to information and set the terms for discussion of the projects and benefit sharing.

Development of the Thacker Pass lithium mine in Nevada, USA has been met with protests and lawsuits from several indigenous tribes who have said they were not provided free prior and informed consent and that the project threatens cultural and sacred sites. Links between resource extraction and missing and murdered indigenous women have also prompted local communities to express concerns that the project will create risks to indigenous women. Protestors have been occupying the site of the proposed mine since January, 2021.

== Research ==
Researchers are actively working to improve the power density, safety, cycle durability (battery life), recharge time, cost, flexibility, and other characteristics, as well as research methods and uses, of these batteries. Solid-state batteries are being researched as a breakthrough in technological barriers. Currently, solid-state batteries are expected to be the most promising next-generation battery, and various companies are working to popularize them.

Research areas for lithium-ion batteries include extending lifetime, increasing energy density, improving safety, reducing cost, and increasing charging speed, among others. Research has been under way in the area of non-flammable electrolytes as a pathway to increased safety based on the flammability and volatility of the organic solvents used in the typical electrolyte. Strategies include aqueous lithium-ion batteries, ceramic solid electrolytes, polymer electrolytes, ionic liquids, and heavily fluorinated systems.

One of the ways to improve batteries is to combine the various cathode materials. This allows researchers to improve on the qualities of a material, while limiting the negatives. One possibility is coating lithium nickel manganese oxide with lithium iron phosphate through resonant acoustic mixing. The resulting material benefits from an increase electrochemical performance and improved capacity retention. Similar work was done with iron (III) phosphate. As it is now accepted that not only transition metals, but also anions in cathodes participate in redox activity necessary for lithium insertion and removal, the design of cathode materials with diverse transition metal cations increasingly consider also oxygen redox reactions in lithium-ion battery cathodes and how these may enhance capacity beyond transition metal limitations, with computational studies using density functional theory helping to optimize materials while minimizing structural degradation. Advances in anionic redox understanding have led to stabilization strategies like surface fluorination, improving cycling stability and safety.

== See also ==
- Nickel-cadmium battery
- Anode-free battery
- Blade battery
- Borate oxalate
- Comparison of commercial battery types
- European Battery Alliance
- Flow battery
- Nanowire battery
- Sodium-ion battery
- Thin-film lithium-ion battery
- VRLA battery
- Ultium
