= Jelly roll (battery) =

Common design for cylindrical battery cells and capacitors

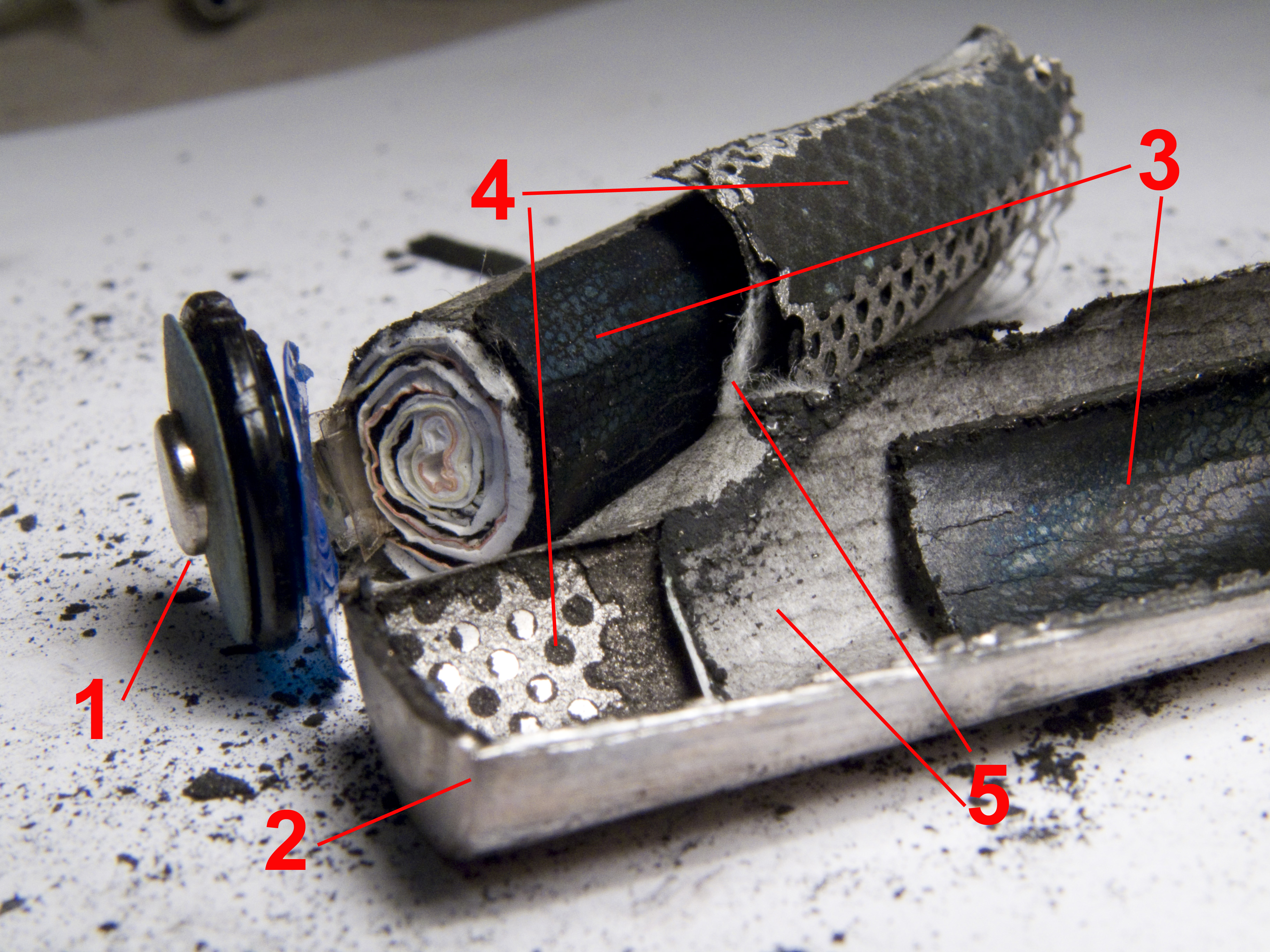
The inside of a Nickel-metal hydride battery, showing the jelly roll design: 1. positive terminal; 2. outer metal casing (also negative terminal); 3. positive electrode; 4. negative electrode with current collector (metal grid, connected to metal casing); 5. separator (between electrodes)

The jelly roll or Swiss roll design is the design used in the majority of cylindrical rechargeable batteries, including nickel–cadmium (Ni-Cd), nickel-metal hydride (Ni-MH), and lithium-ion (Li-ion) batteries. The design has this name because the cross section of the battery looks like a Swiss roll.

In this design, an insulating sheet is laid down, then a thin layer of an anode material is laid down, a separator layer is applied, and a cathode material is layered on top. This sandwich is then rolled up and inserted into a hollow cylinder casing. The battery is sealed, metal contacts are attached, and an optional button top is applied if the battery is intended to replace an AAA/AA/C/D alkaline battery. A label with the brand name is then applied, or a blank protective label, often green (for Ni-MH) or blue (for Ni-Cd) for a generic or OEM battery.

Occasionally, the design is also used for primary (non-rechargeable) batteries, like lithium iron disulfide (Li-FeS2) patented by Energizer, although most common primary batteries use the conventional rod-paste-tube design, like the zinc-carbon and its successor the alkaline battery.

The Swiss roll design is likewise used for the plates of cylindrical capacitors.
