= Aqueous lithium-ion battery =

An aqueous lithium-ion battery is a lithium-ion battery (Li-ion) that uses a concentrated saline solution as an electrolyte to facilitate the transfer of lithium ions between electrodes and induce an electrical current. In contrast to non-aqueous lithium-ion batteries, aqueous Li-ion batteries are nonflammable and do not pose any significant risks of explosion, because of the water-based nature of their electrolyte. They also lack the poisonous chemicals and environmental risks associated with their non-aqueous counterparts.

Aqueous Li-ion batteries are currently severely limited in use due to their narrow electrochemical window of stability (1.23 V). When built using conventional methods, an aqueous Li-ion has a much smaller energy density than a non-aqueous Li-ion battery and can only reach a maximum voltage of 1.5 volts. However, researchers from the University of Maryland (UMD) and the Army Research Laboratory (ARL) made it possible for an aqueous Li-ion battery to remain electrochemically stable at approximately 3.0 volts and withstand severe external damage to a degree not present in non-aqueous Li-ion batteries.

== Development ==
The prototype for the lithium-ion aqueous rechargeable battery was first proposed by Jeff Dahn in 1994, who used lithium manganese oxide as the positive electrode and bronze-phase vanadium dioxide as the negative electrode. In 2014, a team of researchers led by Chunsheung Wang from UMD and Kang Xu from ARL created a new class of aqueous electrolytes called water-in-salt electrolytes (WiSE), which operated under the principle that a high concentration of a specific type of lithium salt resulted in the formation of a protective solid-electrolyte interphase (SEI) in between the electrode surfaces and electrolyte in water-based batteries. Previously, it was thought that this phenomenon could only occur in non-aqueous batteries. Using this approach to create SEI, Wang and Xu dissolved extremely high concentrations of lithium bis(trifluoromethanesulfonyl)imide (LiTFSI) in water (molality > 20 m) to create a WiSE that expanded the voltage window from 1.5V to around 3.0V. The resulting aqueous Li-ion batteries was also capable of cycling up to 1000 times with almost 100% coulombic efficiency.

In 2017, Wang and Xu's research team developed an "inhomogeneous additive" to coat the graphite electrode in their aqueous Li-ion battery, which allowed the battery to reach a 4V threshold and operate up to 70 cycles at that level or higher. The coating, created using an extremely hydrophobic and highly fluorinated ether (HFE), 1,1,2,2-Tetrafluoroethyl-2′,2′,2′-trifluoroethyl ether, expelled water molecules from the electrode surface. This minimizes competing water decomposition and creates a favorable environment for SEI to form. This version of the battery also demonstrated resilience against extreme levels of abuse due to the slow-reacting nature of the SEI When subjected to cutting, external puncture, exposure to salt water, and ballistic testing, the battery did not produce any smoke or fire and continued to operate even with severe external damages.

== Applications ==
Aqueous Li-ion batteries have been of great interest for military use due to their safety and durability. Unlike the high voltage yet volatile non-aqueous Li-ion batteries, aqueous Li-ion batteries have the potential to serve as a more reliable energy source on the battlefield, because external damage to the battery would not diminish performance or cause it to explode. In addition, they are less heavy than traditional batteries and can be manufactured in different shapes, allowing for lighter gear and more efficient placement.

The lower risk of danger that come with aqueous Li-ion batteries make them appealing for industries that manufacture vehicles that prioritize safety over energy density, such as airplanes and submarines.

== Challenges ==
The narrow electrochemical stability window of aqueous Li-ion batteries has remained the bottleneck for development of high-energy aqueous batteries with long cycle life and infallible safety. Water electrolysis occurs outside the stability window causing either oxygen or hydrogen gas formation. Keeping the output voltage low avoids gas evolution and promotes cycling stability, however, it limits energy density and the usage of highly reducing and highly oxidizing electrodes. On the other hand, continuous gas evolution of water during high voltage battery cycling or idling lowers the Coulombic efficiency (CE) and causes serious safety concerns over explosions.

Aqueous Li-ion batteries have a relatively short battery cycle life, ranging from 50 to 100 cycles. As of 2018, research is being conducted to increase the number of cycles to 500 to 1000 cycles, allowing them to feasibly compete against other types of batteries that have a higher energy density. In addition, issues relating to the manufacturing of the protective HFE coating would need to be resolved before the batteries can be scaled up in production for commercial use.

== Sources ==
- Liang, Yanliang; Yao, Yan (15 November 2022). "Designing modern aqueous batteries". Nature Reviews Materials. 8 (2): 109–122. doi:10.1038/s41578-022-00511-3. eISSN 2058-8437.
