= Nanoarchitectures for lithium-ion batteries =

Use of nanotechnology to improve lithium-ion batteries

Nanoarchitectures for lithium-ion batteries are attempts to employ nanotechnology to improve the design of lithium-ion batteries. Research in lithium-ion batteries focuses on improving energy density, power density, safety, durability and cost.

== Research areas ==
=== Energy density ===
Increased energy density requires inserting/extracting more ions from the electrodes. Electrode capacities are compared through three different measures: capacity per unit of mass (known as "specific energy" or "gravimetric capacity"), capacity per unit volume ("volumetric capacity"), and area-normalized specific capacity ("areal capacity").

=== Power density ===
Separate efforts focus on improving power density (rate of charge/discharge). Power density is based upon mass and charge transport, electronic and ionic conductivity, and electron-transfer kinetics; easy transport through shorter distance and greater surface area improve the rates.

=== Anodes ===
Carbon anodes are traditionally used because of lithium's ability to intercalate without unacceptable volumetric expansion. The latter damages the battery and reduces the amount of lithium available for charging. Reduced intercalation limits capacity. Carbon based anodes have a gravimetric capacity of 372 mAh/g for LiC_{6.}

The specific capacity of silicon is approximately ten times greater than carbon. The atomic radius of Si is 1.46 angstroms, while the atomic radius of Li is 2.05 angstroms. The formation of Li_{3.75}Si causes significant volumetric expansion, progressively destroying the anode. Reducing the anode architecture to the nanoscale offers advantages, including improved cycle life and reduced crack propagation and failure. Nanoscale particles are below the critical flaw size within a conductive binder film. Reducing transport lengths(the distance between the anode and cathode) reduces ohmic losses (resistance).

Nanostructuring increases the surface area to volume ratio, which improves both energy and power density due to an increase in the electrochemically active area and a reduction in transport lengths. However, the increase also increases side reactions between the electrode and the electrolyte, causing higher self-discharge, reduced charge/discharge cycles and lower calendar life. Some recent work focused on developing materials that are electrochemically active within the range where electrolyte decomposition or electrolyte/electrode reactions do not occur.

=== Nonconventional architectures ===
A research concept has been proposed in which the major parts of lithium-ion batteries, that is, the anode, electrolyte, and cathode, are combined into one functional molecule. A layer of such functional molecules aligned by the Langmuir-Blodgett method is placed in between two current collectors. The feasibility has not been confirmed yet.

== Nanostructured architectures ==
A significant majority of battery designs are two–dimensional and rely on layered construction. Recent research has taken the electrodes into three-dimensions. This allows for significant improvements in battery capacity; a significant increase in areal capacity occurs between a 2d thick film electrode and a 3d array electrode.

=== Three-dimensional thin–films ===
Solid state batteries employ geometry most similar to traditional thin-film batteries. Three-dimensional thin-films use the third dimension to increase the electrochemically active area. Thin film two dimensional batteries are restricted to between 2-5 micrometres, limiting areal capacity to significantly less than that of three-dimensional geometries.

Dimensionality is increased by using a perforated substrate. One way to create perforations is through inductive coupled plasma etching on silicon.

Another approached used highly anisotropic etching of a silicon substrate through electrochemical or reactive ion etching to create deep trenches. The requisite layers, an anode, separator, and cathode, for a battery were then added by low-pressure chemical vapor deposition. The battery consists of a thin active silicon layer separated from a thin cathodic layer by a solid-state electrolyte. The electrochemically active area consists of 50 nm nanoparticles, smaller than the critical size for crack propagation.

=== Interdigitated electrodes ===
Another architecture is a periodic grouping of anodic and cathodic poles. For this design power and energy density is maximized by minimizing electrode separation. An innate non-uniform current density occurs and lowers cell efficiencies, reduces stability and produces non-uniform heating within the cell. Relative to a two dimensional battery the length (L) over which transport must occur is decreased by two-thirds, which improves kinetics and reduces ohmic loses. Optimization of L can lead to significant improvement in areal capacity; an L on the size scale of 500 micrometres results in a 350% increase in capacity over a comparable two dimensional battery. However, ohmic losses increase with L, eventually offsetting the enhancement achieved through increasing L.

For this geometry, four main designs were proposed: rows of anodes and cathodes, alternating anodes and cathodes, hexagonally packed 1:2 anodes:cathodes, and alternating anodic and cathodic triangular poles where the nearest neighbors in the row are rotated 180 degrees.

The row design has a large, non-uniform current distribution. The alternating design exhibits better uniformity, given a high number of electrodes of opposite polarity. For systems with an anode or cathode that is sensitive to non-uniform current density, non-equal numbers of cathodes and anodes can be used; the 2:1 hexagonal design allows for a uniform current density at the anode but a non-uniform current distribution at the cathode. Performance can be increased through changing the shape of the poles. The triangular design improves cell capacity and power by sacrificing current uniformity. A similar system uses interdigitated plates instead of poles.

In 2013 researchers used additive manufacturing to create stacked, interdigitated electrodes. The battery was no larger than a grain of sand. The process placed anodes and cathodes closer to each other than before. The ink for the anode was nanoparticles of one lithium metal oxide compound, and the ink for the cathode from nanoparticles of another. The printer deposited the inks onto the teeth of two gold combs, forming an interlaced stack of anodes and cathodes.

=== Concentric electrodes ===
The concentric cylinder design is similar to interdigitated poles. Instead of discrete anode and cathode poles, the anode or cathode is kept as a pole that is coated by electrolyte. The other electrode serves as the continuous phase in which the anode/cathode resides. The main advantage is that the amount of electrolyte is reduced, increasing energy density. This design maintains a short transport distance like the interdigitated system and thus has a similar benefit to charge and mass transport, while minimizing ohmic loses.

=== Inverse opal ===
A version of the concentric cylinder packed particles or close-packed polymer to create a three-dimensionally ordered macroporous (3DOM) carbon anode. This system is fabricated by using colloidal crystal templating, electrochemical thin-film growth, and soft sol–gel chemistry. 3DOM materials have a unique structure of nanometer thick walls that surround interconnected and closed-packed sub-micrometer voids. The 3DOM structure is coated with a thin polymer layer and then filled with second conducting phase. This method leads to a battery with short transport lengths, high ionic conductivity and reasonable electrical conductivity. It removes the need for additives that do not contribute to electrochemical performance. Performance can be improved by coating with tin oxide nanoparticles to enhance the initial capacity. The coating infiltrates the network formed by the 3DOM structure to produce uniform thickness.

=== Nanowires and nanotubes ===
Nanowire and nanotubes have been integrated with various battery components. The reason for this interest is because of shortened transport lengths, resistance to degradation and storage. For carbon nanotubes (CNT), lithium-ions can be stored on the exterior surface, in the interstitial sites between the nanotubes and on the tube's interior.

Nanowires have been incorporated into the anode/cathode matrix to provide a builtin conductive charge collector and enhancing capacity. The nanowires were incorporated through a solution-based method that allows the active material to be printed on a substrate.

Another approach uses a CNT-cellulose composite. CNTs were grown on a silicon substrate by thermal-CVD and then embedded in cellulose. Finally a lithium electrode is added on top of the cellulose across from the CNTs.

In 2007 Si nanowires were fabricated on a steel substrate by a vapor-liquid solid growth method. These nanowires exhibited close to the theoretical value for silicon and showed only minimal fading after a 20% drop between the first to second cycles. This performance is attributed to the facile strain relaxation that allows for accommodations of large strains, while maintaining good contact with the current collector and efficient 1D electron transport along the nanowire.

=== Aperiodic electrodes ===
Periodic structures lead to non-uniform current densities that lower efficiency and decrease stability. The aperiodic structure is typically made of either aerogels or somewhat more dense ambigels that forms a porous aperiodic sponge. Aerogels and ambigels are formed from wet gels; aerogels are formed when wet gels are dried such that no capillary forces are established, while ambigels are wet gels dried under conditions that minimize capillary forces. Aerogels and ambigels are unique in that 75-99% of the material is ‘open’ but interpenetrated by a solid that is on the order of 10 nm, resulting in pores on the order of 10 to 100 nm. The solid is covalently networked and resistant to agglomeration and sintering. Beyond aperiodicity, these structures are used because the porous structure allows for rapid diffusion throughout the material, and the porous structure provides a large reaction surface. Fabrication is through coating the ambigel with a polymer electrolyte and then filling the void space with RuO_{2} colloids that act as an anode.

== Conformal coatings ==
Most designs were half-cell experiments; testing only the anode or cathode. As geometries become more complex, non-line-of-sight methods to in-fill the design with electrolyte materials supply the oppositely charged electrode is essential. These batteries can be coated with various materials to improve their performance and stability. However, chemical and physical heterogeneity leaves molecular-level control a significant challenge, especially since the electrochemistry for energy storage is not defect-tolerant.

=== Layer-by-layer (LbL) ===
LbL approaches are used to coat 3d nanoarchitecture. Electrostatically binding a charged polymer to an oppositely charged surface coats the surface with polymer. Repeated steps of oppositely charged polymer build up a well-controlled thick layer. Polyelectrolyte films and ultrathin (less than 5 nm) of electroactive polymers have been deposited on planar substrates using this method. However, problems exist with the deposition of polymers within complex geometries, e.g. pores, on the size scale of 50-300 nm, resulting in defective coatings. One potential solution is to use self-limiting approaches.

=== Atomic layer deposition (ALD) ===
Another approach to coating is ALD which coats the substrate layer-by-layer with atomic precision. The precision is because reactions are confined to the surface containing an active chemical moiety that reacts with a precursor; this limits thickness to one monolayer. This self-limiting growth is essential for complete coatings since deposition does not inhibit the access by other polymeric units to non-coated sites. Thicker samples can be produced by cycling gases in a similar manner to alternating with oppositely charged polymers in LbL. In practice ALD may require a few cycles in order to achieve the desired coverage and can result in varied morphologies such as islands, isolated crystallites, or nanoparticles. Morphology can alter electrochemical behavior and therefore must be carefully controlled.

ALD was also used to deposit iron oxide on 3DOM carbon to enhance reactivity between lithium and oxygen. The iron was then coatedwith palladium nanoparticles, which effectively reduced carbon's destructive reaction with oxygen and improved the discharge cycle. Wang said the findings show 3DOm carbon can meet new performance standards when it is stabilized.

=== Electropolymerization ===
Electropolymerization supplies a thin polymer film, 10 to 100 nm. The electropolymerization of an insulating polymer results in self-limiting deposition as the active moiety is protected; the deposition can also be self-limiting if the polymer can block the solubilized monomer and prohibit continued growth. Through the control of electrochemical variables, polyaniline and polythiophene can be deposited in a controlled manner. Styrene, methyl methacrylate, phenols and other electrically insulating polymers have been deposited on the electrodes to act as a separator that allows ionic transport, but inhibits electrical transport to prevent shorts. Mesoporous manganese dioxide ambigels have been protected by 7-9 nm films of polymer such that dissolution of the manganese dioxide in aqueous acid was avoided. Uniform coatings require the architecture to be wetted by the monomer solution; this can be achieved through a solution that displays a similar surface energy to that of the porous solid. As the scale continuous to decrease and transport through the solid becomes more difficult, pre-equilibration is needed to ensure coating uniformity.
