= Lithium tetrafluoroborate =

Names
- IUPAC name Lithium tetrafluoroborate
- Other names Borate(1-), tetrafluoro-, lithium

Identifiers
CAS Number	14283-07-9
3D model (JSmol)	Interactive image
ChemSpider	3504162
ECHA InfoCard	100.034.692
PubChem CID	4298216
UNII	AF751CNK2N
CompTox Dashboard (EPA)	DTXSID00884741
- InChI: InChI=1S/BF4.Li/c2-1(3,4)5;/q-1;+1 Key: UFXJWFBILHTTET-UHFFFAOYSA-N; InChI=1/BF4.Li/c2-1(3,4)5;/q-1;+1 Key: UFXJWFBILHTTET-UHFFFAOYAL
- SMILES: [Li+].F[B-](F)(F)F

Properties
Chemical formula	LiBF_{4}
Molar mass	93.74 g·mol^{−1}
Appearance	White/grey crystalline solid
Odor	odorless
Density	0.852 g/cm^{3}
Melting point	296.5 °C (565.7 °F; 569.6 K)
Boiling point	decomposes
Solubility in water	Very soluble

Hazards
- Occupational safety and health (OHS/OSH)
Main hazards	Harmful, causes burns, hygroscopic.
NFPA 704 (fire diamond)	1 0 1
Safety data sheet (SDS)	External MSDS

Related compounds
Other anions	Tetrafluoroborate,
Related compounds	Nitrosyl tetrafluoroborate
- Except where otherwise noted, data are given for materials in their standard state (at 25 °C [77 °F], 100 kPa). verify (what is ?) Infobox references

Lithium tetrafluoroborate is an inorganic compound with the formula LiBF_{4}. It is a white crystalline powder. It has been extensively tested for use in commercial secondary batteries, an application that exploits its high solubility in nonpolar solvents.

== Applications ==
Although BF^{−}_{4} has high ionic mobility, solutions of its Li^{+} salt are less conductive than other less associated salts. As an electrolyte in lithium-ion batteries, LiBF_{4} offers some advantages relative to the more common LiPF_{6}. It exhibits greater thermal stability and moisture tolerance. For example, LiBF_{4} can tolerate a moisture content up to 620 ppm at room temperature whereas LiPF_{6} readily hydrolyzes into toxic phosphoryl fluoride (POF_{3}) and hydrogen fluoride (HF) gases, often destroying the battery's electrode materials. Disadvantages of the electrolyte include a relatively low conductivity and difficulties forming a stable solid electrolyte interface with graphite electrodes.

== Thermal stability ==
Because LiBF_{4} and other alkali-metal salts thermally decompose to evolve boron trifluoride (BF_{3}), the salt is commonly used as a convenient source of the chemical at the laboratory scale:

LiBF_{4} → LiF + BF_{3}

== Production ==
LiBF_{4} is a byproduct in the industrial synthesis of diborane:

8 BF_{3} + 6 LiH → B_{2}H_{6} + 6 LiBF_{4}

It can also be synthesized from LiF and BF_{3} in an appropriate solvent that is resistant to fluorination by BF_{3} (e.g. HF, Bromine trifluoride (BrF_{3}), or liquified Sulfur dioxide (SO_{2}):

LiF + BF_{3} → LiBF_{4}
