= Lithium bis(trifluoromethanesulfonyl)imide =

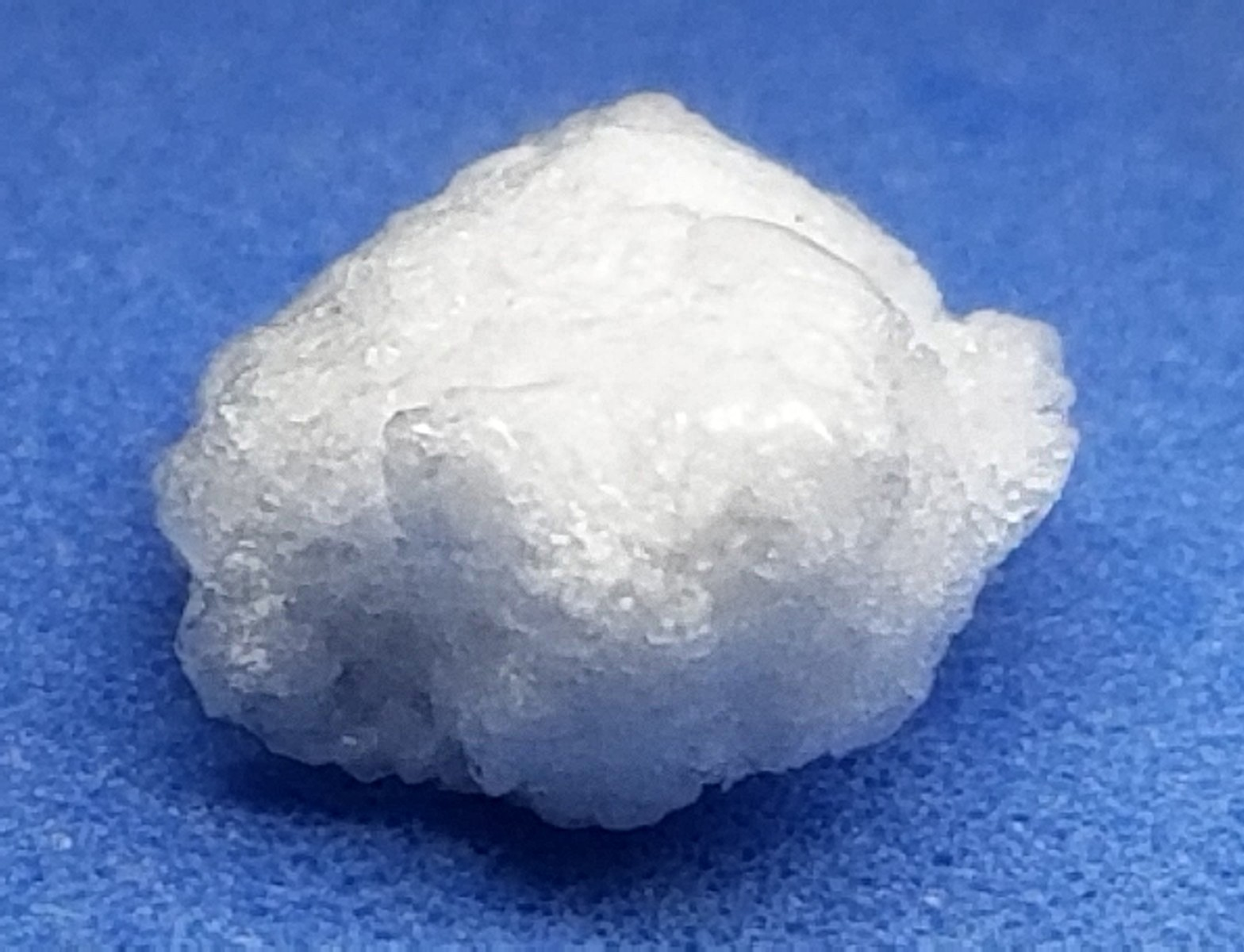

Names
- IUPAC name Lithium bis(trifluoromethylsulfonyl)azanide
- Other names LiTFSI

Identifiers
CAS Number	90076-65-6
3D model (JSmol)	Interactive image
ChemSpider	2058897
ECHA InfoCard	100.101.430
EC Number	415-300-0
PubChem CID	3816071
RTECS number	XR2775000
UNII	9Y730392A5
CompTox Dashboard (EPA)	DTXSID8044468
- InChI: InChI=1S/C2F6NO4S2.Li/c3-1(4,5)14(10,11)9-15(12,13)2(6,7)8;/q-1;+1 Key: QSZMZKBZAYQGRS-UHFFFAOYSA-N
- SMILES: [Li+].C(F)(F)(F)S(=O)(=O)[N-]S(=O)(=O)C(F)(F)F

Properties
Chemical formula	LiC_{2}F_{6}NO_{4}S_{2}
Molar mass	287.09 g/mol
Appearance	White solid
Odor	odorless
Density	2.15 g/cm^{3} (20 °C)
Melting point	236 °C (457 °F; 509 K)
Solubility in water	80.65% (22 °C)

Hazards
- GHS labelling
Pictograms	(GHS05: Corrosive) (GHS06: Toxic) (GHS08: Health hazard)
Signal word	Danger
Hazard statements	H301, H310, H311, H314, H372, H373, H412
Precautionary statements	P260, P262, P264, P264+P265, P270, P273, P280, P301+P316, P301+P330+P331, P302+P352, P302+P361+P354, P304+P340, P305+P354+P338, P316, P317, P319, P321, P330, P361+P364, P363, P405, P501
- Safety data sheet (SDS)

Related compounds
Other anions	Bistriflimide
- Except where otherwise noted, data are given for materials in their standard state (at 25 °C [77 °F], 100 kPa). verify (what is ?) Infobox references

Lithium bis(trifluoromethanesulfonyl)imide, often simply referred to as LiTFSI, is a hydrophilic salt with the chemical formula LiC_{2}F_{6}NO_{4}S_{2}. It is commonly used as Li-ion source in electrolytes for Li-ion batteries as a safer alternative to commonly used lithium hexafluorophosphate. It is made up of one Li cation and a bistriflimide anion.

Because of its very high solubility in water (> 21 m), LiTFSI has been used as lithium salt in water-in-salt electrolytes for aqueous lithium-ion batteries.
