= C13H10O3 =

The molecular formula C_{13}H_{10}O_{3} (molar mass: 214.216 g/mol) may refer to:

- 4,4'-Dihydroxybenzophenone
- Diphenyl carbonate
- Phenyl salicylate
