= Timeline of plastic development =

This is a timeline of the development of plastics, comprising key discoveries and developments in the production of plastics.

== Pre 19th century ==
Year	Event	Reference
1600 BC	Mesoamericans use natural rubber for balls and figurines.	
1000 BC	First written evidence of Shellac.	
Middle Ages	Europeans use treated cow horns as translucent material for windows. Japanese and Chinese use ox horns for the same purpose as well as for shades of oil lamps.	

== 19th century ==
Year	Event	Reference
1839	Eduard Simon, a German apothecary, discovers polystyrene.	
1844	Thomas Hancock patents the vulcanization of rubber in Britain immediately followed by Charles Goodyear in United States.	
1856	Parkesine, the first member of the Celluloid class of compounds and considered the first man-made plastic, is patented by Alexander Parkes.	
1869	John Wesley Hyatt discovers a method to simplify the production of celluloid, making industrial production possible.	
1872	PVC is accidentally synthesized in 1872 by German chemist Eugen Baumann.	
1889	Eastman Kodak successfully files a patent for celluloid film.	
1890s	Galalith, a plastic derived from casein, is developed by Wilhelm Krische and Adolph Spitteler.	
1890s	Auguste Trillat discovers the means to insolubilize casein by immersion in formaldehyde, producing material marketed as galalith.	
1894	Shellac phonograph records are developed and soon become an industry standard.	
1898	The German chemist Hans von Pechmann first synthesizes polyethylene while investigating diazomethane.	

== 20th century ==
Year	Event	Reference
1907	Bakelite, the first fully synthetic thermoset, is reported by Leo Baekeland using phenol and formaldehyde.	
1912	After over 10 years' research, Jacques E. Brandenberger develops a method for producing cellophane and secures a patent.	
1926	Waldo Semon and the B.F. Goodrich Company develops a method to plasticize PVC by blending it with various additives.	
1930	Neoprene is produced for the first time at DuPont.	
1930s	Polystyrene is first produced by BASF.	
1931	RCA Victor introduces its vinyl-based Victrolac compound for records. Vinyl records have twice the groove density of shellac records with good sound quality.	
1933	The first industrially practical polyethylene synthesis is discovered by Eric Fawcett and Reginald Gibson at the Imperial Chemical Industries (ICI) works in Northwich, England.	
1935	Nylon is invented and patented by DuPont.	
1938	Nylon is first used for bristles in toothbrushes. It features at the 1939 World's Fair and is famously used in stockings in 1940.	
1938	Polytetrafluoroethylene (commonly known as teflon), discovered by Roy Plunkett at DuPont.	
1941	Polyethylene terephthalate (PET) is discovered at the Calico Printers' Association in Britain. Expanded polystyrene is first produced.	
1950	DuPont begin the manufacture of polyester.	
1951	J. Paul Hogan and Robert L. Banks from Phillips polymerize propylene for the first time to produce polypropylene.	
1953	Polycarbonate is independently developed by Hermann Schnell at Bayer and Daniel Fox at General Electric.	
1954	Polypropylene is discovered by Giulio Natta with production starting in 1957	
1954	Expanded polystyrene, used for building insulation, packaging, and cups, is invented by Dow Chemical.	
1957	The Italian firm Montecatini begins large-scale commercial production of isotactic polypropylene.	
1960s	High-density polyethylene bottles are introduced; they will replace glass bottles in most applications.	
1965	Kevlar is developed at DuPont by Stephanie Kwolek.	
1980s	Polyester film stock replaces cellulose acetate for photographic film and computer tapes.	
1988	The first polymer bank notes are issued in Australia.	
