= Origomu =

Origomu is a movement originated in New York City by Chilean artist Tatiana Pagés in 2009. It is the practice of recycling plastic waste into wearable art. Origomu or オリゴム comes from the Japanese ori, meaning “folding”, and gomu, meaning “rubber”.

== Overview ==
The technique has been taught in workshops at Pratt Institute in New York City, making necklaces using six-pack rings as chief material. Origomu is based in connecting art and fashion with environmental awareness. The technique has also been taught in workshops for low-income women.

Origomu necklaces has since been displayed at the Eco-Fashion exhibit at The Museum of FIT, the Cirque Du Soleil Ecological Tent in Montreal, Canada, the country of Ecuador and the Punta Cana Foundation in Dominican Republic.

Origomu organized an international design contest. Creations from 25 countries were submitted and design and fashion experts chose the most innovative pieces. There was a first round of 8 finalists, out of these, three winners.

By April 2011, the movement had collected over 200,000 plastic six-pack rings, resulting in more than 500 Origomu designs. Over 305 designers have created Origomu pieces from countries such as Mexico, India, Portugal, New Zealand, United States, Ecuador, Chile, Belgium and Switzerland, among others.
