= Polymer devolatilization =

Polymer devolatilization, also known as polymer degassing, is the process of removing low-molecular-weight components such as residual monomers, solvents, reaction by-products and water from polymers.

== Motivation ==
When exiting a reactor after a polymerization reaction, many polymers still contain undesired low-molecular weight components. These component may make the product unusable for further processing (for example, a polymer solution cannot directly be used for plastics processing), may be toxic, may cause bad sensory properties such as an unpleasant smell or worsen the properties of the polymer. It may also be desirable to recycle monomers and solvents to the process. Plastic recycling can also involve removal of water and volatile degradation products.

== Basic process types ==
Devolatilization can be carried out when a polymer is in the solid or liquid phase, with the volatile components going into a liquid or gas phase. Examples are:

- Solid polymer, liquid phase: Extraction of caprolactam from polyamides with water.
- Solid polymer, gas phase: Removal of ethylene from polyethylene via air or nitrogen in silos.
- Liquid polymer, gas phase: Removal of styrene from polystyrene via vacuum.

It is usual for different types of devolatilization steps to be combined to overcome limitations in the individual steps.

== Physical and chemical aspects ==
=== Thermodynamics ===
The thermodynamic activity of volatiles needs to be higher in the polymer than in the other phase for them to leave the polymer. In order to design such a process, the activity needs to be calculated. This is usually done via the Flory–Huggins solution theory. This effect can be enhanced via higher temperatures or lower partial pressure of the volatile component by applying an inert gas or lower pressure.

=== Diffusion ===
In order to be removed from the polymer, the volatile components need to travel to a phase boundary via diffusion. Because of the low diffusion coefficients of volatiles in polymers, this can be the rate-determining step. This effect can be enhanced by higher temperatures or by small diffusion lengths due to its higher Fourier number.

=== Heat transfer ===
Because polymers and polymer solutions often have a very high viscosity, the flow in devolatilizers is laminar, leading to low heat transfer coefficients, which can also be a limiting factor.

=== Chemical stability ===
Higher temperatures can also affect the chemical stability of the polymer and thus its use properties. If a polymer's ceiling temperature is exceeded, it will partially revert to its monomers, destroying its usability. More generally, polymer degradation also occurs during devolatilization, limiting the temperature and residence time available for the process.

=== Foam vs. film devolatilization ===
There are two basic forms of devolatilization to a vacuum. In foam devolatilization, bubbles inside the polymer solution nucleate and grow, finally bursting and releasing their volatile content to the surroundings. This requires sufficient vapor pressure. If possible, this is a very efficient method because the volatiles only need to diffuse a short way.

Film devolatilization occurs when there is no longer sufficient vapor pressure to generate bubbles, and requires on sufficient surface area and good mixing. In this case, stripping agent such as nitrogen may be added to the polymer to induce improved mass transfer through bubbles.

== Types of devolatilizers for polymer melt ==
Devolatilizers for polymer melts are classified as static or moving, also called "still" and "rotating" in the literature.

=== Static devolatilizers ===
Static devolatilizers include:

- Falling strand devolatilizers: Polymer is partitioned into many individual strands which fall down in a vacuum chamber. Diffusion moves volatiles into the gas phase, which are then collected via a vacuum system. This is usually the last stage of a devolatizing process, when vapor pressure is low.
- Falling film evaporator: Polymer falls down vertical walls, volatiles diffusing on the side that is not in contact with the walls.
- Tube evaporators: A boiling polymer solution flows downward in a vertical shell and tube heat exchanger into a separator. Polymer is collected at the bottom, vapor is collected via a vacuum system and condensers.
- Flash evaporators: A polymer solution is preheated and brought into a separator, where pressure below the vapor pressure of the solution leads to a part of the volatiles evaporating.

=== Moving devolatilizers ===
- Co-rotating twin screw extruders: The polymer solution is brought into a co-rotating twin screw extruders, where it is subjected to shear and mechanical energy input and where vapors are drawn off. This type of machine allows different pressures in different zones. An advantage is the self-cleaning action of those extruders.
- Single-screw extruders: In principle similar to co-rotating twin screw extruders, without the self-cleaning action.
- Wiped-film evaporators: Polymer solution is brought into a single large vessel, where a rotor agitates the product and creates surface renewal. Only a single pressure level is possible in these machines.
- Large-volume kneaders: A polymer solution is brought into a large-volume kneader and subjected to shear at longer residence times than in an extruder.

== Devolatilizers for suspensions and latexes ==
Removal of monomers and solvents from latex and suspensions, for example in the production of synthetic rubber, is usually done via stirred vessels.
