= Daniel Fox (chemist) =

Dr. Daniel W. Fox and LEXAN polycarbonate

Dr. Daniel W. Fox (May 14, 1927 – February 15, 1989) was an American polymer chemist who is often regarded as the father of LEXAN. LEXAN is the flagship product of SABIC Innovative Plastics (formerly GE Plastics) and is used in everything from CDs and DVDs to car bumpers. Though Dr. Fox is often credited with the invention of LEXAN resin, the patent and agreement to share the plastic between Bayer and General Electric is much more complicated than the simplistic "Father of LEXAN Polycarbonate" title bestowed upon Dr. Fox by many sources.

== Education and employment ==
Dr. Fox began his academic career at Lebanon Valley College in Annville, Pennsylvania. He graduated in 1948 with a degree in chemistry. He then continued his education at the University of Oklahoma in Norman, obtaining both his M.S. and Ph.D. degrees from this institution.

Upon his graduation, he was hired by General Electric in Pittsfield, Massachusetts as the new manager of chemical development. It was there in 1953 that he invented LEXAN while working on a project to develop new wire insulation material. For the next 35 years, he produced ground breaking research in his field and eventually was the holder of 44 patents. He retired from GE in June 1988, but continued his polymer research until his death in February 1989.

At GE, his employees often referred to themselves as students of "Dan Fox University" because of Dr. Fox's impressive ability to recognize and promote young, talented scientists. Jack Welch, former CEO and chairman of GE, was one of the most notable students to graduate from Dan Fox University.

== LEXAN patent ==
Even though Dr. Fox is often credited with the invention of this plastics product, he was not the first. In 1955, Fox applied for a patent, two years after his initial discovery of the material. In the same year, Bayer in Germany had also applied for a U.S. patent on a molecule invented by Dr. Hermann Schnell that was virtually identical to Fox's. So before it was decided who was to receive the patent, GE and Bayer entered into an agreement that stipulated whoever received the US patent would agree to allow the other to operate by paying a royalty to the patent holder. This worked out in GE's favor after the patent was awarded to Bayer because Schnell's date of invention preceded Fox's by only one week. Dr. Fox may be considered the father of LEXAN polycarbonate, but indeed he shares that honor with Dr. Schnell.

== Awards, honors, and achievements ==
- He was the recipient of GE's first Steinmetz Award in 1973, a recognition of their top scientists.
- He was the youngest living person to be inducted into the Plastics Hall of Fame in 1976.
- He held 44 patents.
- He developed LEXAN, a strong and useful thermoplastic products, that is credited with kicking off the thermoplastics business.
- Dan Fox Drive in Pittsfield, Massachusetts is named after Dr. Fox.
- His alma mater, Lebanon Valley College, created a summer program where students spend a week experiencing life at the college. It also gives students experiences in areas that they want to study after high school. The program, which lasts for 5 days in June, is known as the Daniel Fox Youth Scholars Institute.

== Selected journal articles ==
- Fox, Daniel W., Peters, Edward N. (1985). Engineering thermoplastics: Chemistry and technology. ACS Symposium Series, 495–514.
- Fox, D.W., Gallucci, R.R., Peters, E.N., Smith, G.F. (1985). Polysulfone carbonate copolymers. Annual Technical Conference - Society of Plastics Engineers, 951–953.
