= Heinz List =

German engineer

Heinz List was a German engineer. In the 1940s, Germany's biggest chemical industry conglomerate established a committee to explore screw technology in mixing and kneading applications. Three men who served on that committee would go on to become founding fathers of modern processing technology. One of them, Heinz List, became the first engineer to seriously explore the feasibility of concentrated solid-fluid reactions. Until then, such processes had been thought to be impractical due to the presence of highly viscous, solid, and crusty phases. Heinz List believed he could overcome these difficulties, and that the future lay in solvent-free processing.

== Background ==
During World War II, BAYER-Werk, part of the former IG Farben Company (IG Farben was founded on December 2, 1925 as a merger of six companies including BASF, Bayer, Hoechst, and Agfa), initiated research to explore screw technology in mixing and kneading applications. Three men who served on that committee would go on to become the founding fathers of modern processing technology.

Rudolph Erdmenger would later develop the co-rotating twin screw machine, the ZSK-Extruder. Siegfried Kiesskalt went on to pioneer special counter rotating screw extruder designs.

A third committee member, Heinz List, was assigned the study of "special designs". It was here that he first developed the concept for a single-screw-machine that combined oscillation with screw rotation. This design ultimately evolved into the continuously operating Ko-Kneader. Coincidentally, the introduction of the Ko-Kneader corresponded with the rapid development of the plastics industry. To date, over 3000 Ko-Kneader systems have been sold worldwide.

During this time, Heinz List also became the first engineer to seriously explore the feasibility of solid-fluid reactions. Until then, such reactions were thought to be impractical due to the highly viscous and solid phases. List, however, believed that the answer lay in developing technology for concentrated, solvent-free processes.

== Inventor of the Co-Kneader ==
List's first design was a single-screw machine that combined oscillation with rotation, and ultimately evolved into the commercially successful Co-Kneader. By 1965 he had developed the twin-shaft All Phases processor, the first machine that could reliably and safely process highly viscous, pasty and crust-forming products.

== High Viscosity Processing ==
In 1966, Heinz List established his own company to further develop the field of high-viscosity processing. Heinz List established the LIST Dry Processing Group based on the following:

Machines that can handle multiple phase transitions (wet, pasty, viscous, powdery, granular) in one working step provide maximum energy efficiency and process yield.

Future processing technology will depend on machines that can efficiently handle large working volumes, are self-cleaning, offer a wide range of residence times, and exhibit excellent mixing and kneading performance during wet, pasty and viscous phases.

== LIST KneaderReactor Technology ==
The company's first successes were in simple drying and kneading applications. Subsequently, LIST Kneader Reactor technology showed that it could effectively combine multiple phases and process steps — reaction, crystallization, drying, melting, mixing, kneading and evaporation — in a single machine.

It was this thinking that led List to develop the Mixing Kneader Technology, a new generation of processing technology. In 1969, the AP (All Phases) system was developed and was the first twin shaft machine. In 1972, the company reached another milestone with the development of the single-shaft DISCOTHERM-B.

== Polymer Processing Hall of Fame ==
Though Heinz List died in 1988, he is remembered both as a pioneering engineer — one of only 26 members of the Polymer Processing Hall of Fame at the University of Akron, Ohio, USA — and as a business leader. Under his sons Jörg and Klaus List, the company has thrived and expanded into new industries: polymers, fibers and food. Today LIST is world leader in numerous industries, including TDI, Sugar Replacer, ABS, Fiber Spinning Solutions, SAP (Super Absorbent Polymers), and EPDM.

LIST Today Headquartered in Switzerland, and with offices in the US, India and South Korea, LIST is the worldwide technology leader and forerunner in dry or concentrated processing focusing on processes that operate without the use of solvents.
