= Economics of plastics processing =

Economic aspects of plastic manufacturing

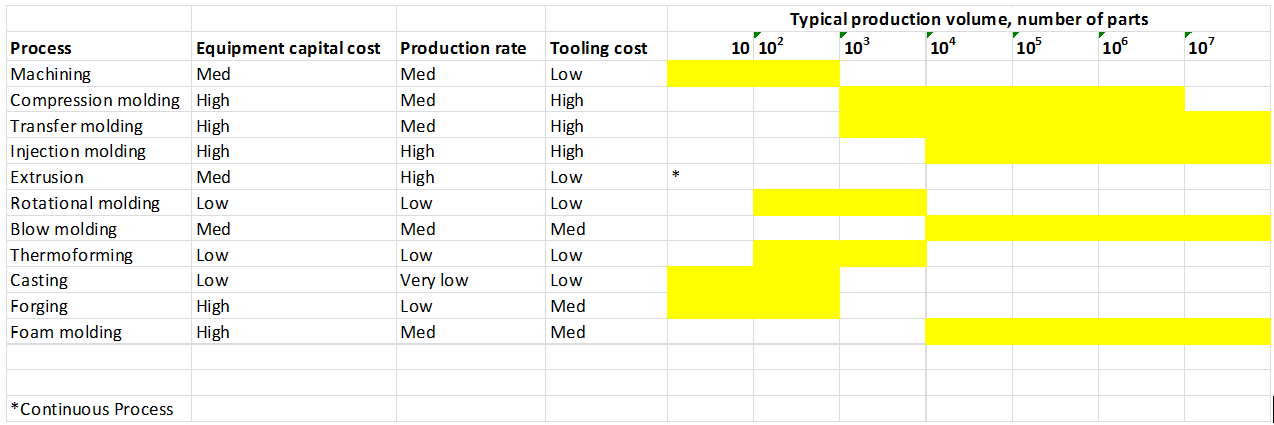
Figure 1: Comparative Costs and Production Volumes For Processing of Plastics

The economics of plastics processing is determined by the type of process. Plastics can be processed with the following methods: machining, compression molding, transfer molding, injection molding, extrusion, rotational molding, blow molding, thermoforming, casting, forging, and foam molding. Processing methods are selected based on equipment cost, production rate, tooling cost, and build volume. High equipment and tooling cost methods are typically used for large production volumes whereas low - medium equipment cost and tooling cost methods are used for low production volumes. Compression molding, transfer molding, injection molding, forging, and foam molding have high equipment and tooling cost. Lower cost processes are machining, extruding, rotational molding, blow molding, thermoforming, and casting. A summary of each process and its cost is displayed in figure 1.

== Aspects of plastic processing ==
=== Degradable plastics ===
Oxo-degradable plastics: these are petroleum-based plastics with additives such as transition metals and metals salts that promote the process of fragmentation of the plastic when exposed to a particular environment, such as high temperature or oxygen rich one, for a prolonged period of time. Fragmentation exposes a larger surface area of the plastic to colonies of bacteria that eventually decompose the polymer into its lower energy state components: carbon dioxide and water.

Some aspects to take into account regarding this method to dispose of end-of-life plastics are:

- The type of polymer: experiments conducted by Chiellini et al. confirmed that bacteria are only able to decompose low molecular weight polymers (at least at a rate that can be appreciated).
- Environmental conditions: the time for fragmentation/degradation varies according to conditions which aren’t always controllable.
- Material’s potential to be recycled: this characteristic will be compromised, since the polymer’s durability or strength will be affected by the additives that accelerate fragmentation.

Classifying a polymer as bio-degradable requires specifications regarding these aspects.

Important economic aspects that need to be considered when disposing of degradable polymers include:

- Waste landfill costs: if plastics represent a significant percentage of waste in a particular region, manufacturing plastics with bio-degradable properties may be more profitable and ecologically friendly than merely disposing of a non-degradable plastic. By using degradable polymers, costs due to waste transportation, landfill maintenance, new landfill excavation and environmental hazard control can be avoided.
- Lost end-of-life plastic potential: processes such as energy recovery of the plastic by incineration or biological treatment and material recovery by recycling have to be taken into account when assessing the feasibility of manufacturing degradable polymers.

=== Reusable plastic containers ===
The implementation of reusable plastic containers arises as a consequence of concerns with sustainability and environmental impact. Use of recyclable plastic packages is beneficial environmentally but is more expensive. The adoption of reusable plastic containers will amount to an approximate annual increase of 0.058 euros/kg of delivered goods. The cost associated with reusable plastic containers are packaging purchasing costs, transportation costs, labor/handling costs, management costs, and costs resulting from losses. Packaging purchasing costs encompasses the cost of the containers as well as any associated service costs. This cost is reoccurring but is only relevant once every 50 cycles, which is the typical lifetime of reusable plastic containers. One cycle consists of the initial stages of processing plastic containers all the way to the use and recycling of these containers by the consumers. Transportation costs are slightly higher for reusable plastic containers as compared to traditional use and throwaway plastic containers in that these reusable containers need additional transportation to recycling facilities. Reusable plastic containers also require work loading and unloading from trucks as well as quality inspection, this adds additional labor costs. Management costs exists because reusable plastic container stock count needs to be managed. The final cost of reusable plastic containers is the cost incurred when packages are lost or there are errors within the management system. Figure 2 provides a detailed summary of the costs associated with adopting reusable plastic containers.

=== Incineration of plastics ===
Recycling plastics presents the difficulty of handling mixed plastics, as unmixed plastics are usually necessary to maintain desirable properties. Mixing many plastics results in diminished material properties, with even just a few percent of polypropylene mixed with polyethylene producing a plastic with significantly reduced tensile strength. An alternative to recycling of these plastics and those which can’t be easily recycled such as thermosets is to use degradation to break the polymers down into monomers of low molecular weight. The products of this process can be used to make high quality polymers however energy stored in the polymer bonds is lost during this process.

An alternative to economically dispose of plastics is to burn them in an incinerator. Incinerators capable of cleanly burning polymers exist and while they require significant capital investment, the energy produced offsets the economic impact. Since most plastics are produced from petroleum, their molecules consist exclusively or primarily of carbon, oxygen, and hydrogen atoms. With proper design, an incinerator can completely combust these plastics allowing the recovery of energy stored in the original petroleum feedstock which would otherwise escape during processes such as degradation. Some polymers contain chlorine or nitrogen which can result in undesirable combustion products however the use of scrubbers can remove such products. The end result is that many polymers burn more cleanly than coal and as clean as most oils.
