= Kneader reactor =

Apparatus for mixing and kneading viscous substances

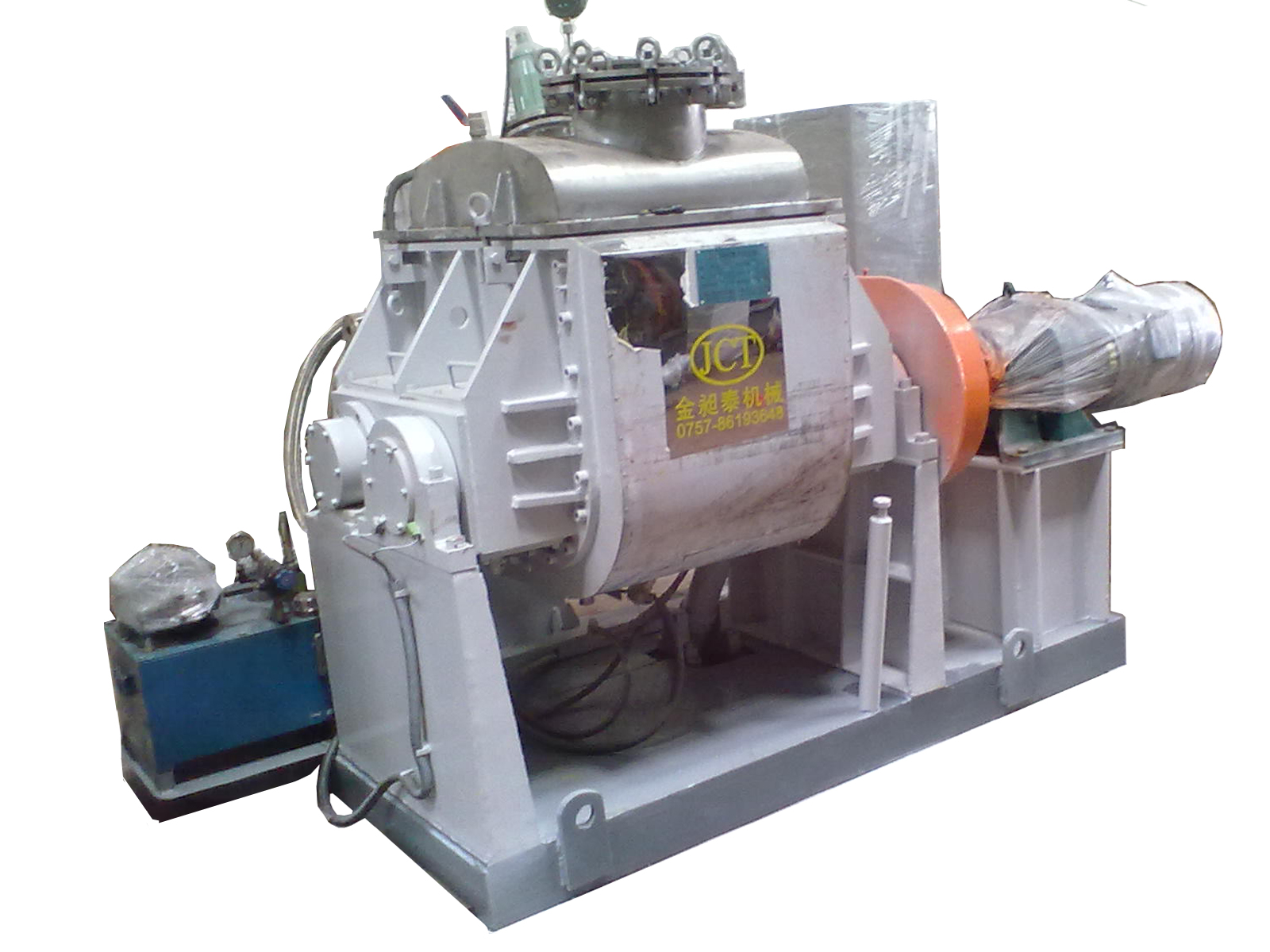
Kneader Reactor

A kneader reactor (or kneading reactor) is a device used for mixing and kneading substances with high viscosity. Many industries, such as the food processing, utilize kneader reactors to produce goods, as for example, polymers or chewing gum. Although the machine has existed for decades, kneader reactors are only recently gaining popularity in the processing industry.

== Description ==
The kneading reactor is a horizontal mixing machine with two Sigma, or Z-type blades. These blades are driven by separate gears at different speeds, one running 1.5 times faster than the other. The reactor has one powerful motor and a speed reducer to drive the two blades. The kneader reactor usually has a W-type barrel with a hydraulic tilt that turns it, and a heating jacket outside.

== Usage ==
The kneader reactor uses very high viscosity materials such as chewing gum, dough, toffee, Plasticine, rubber, silicone, adhesive or resin. These materials have a viscosity of approximately 1,000,000 cps. They are mixed with reactants such as liquids, powders or slurries; the reaction mass does not undergo a physical phase change while the reaction takes place.

== How to select ==
If a phase change does occur during processing, the conventional technology requires the use of diluents (or dilutants). Diluents are solvents which decrease the viscosity of the reaction mass, enabling mixing in the reactor, and help to control the reaction temperature.

More recently, manufacturers have sought technological solutions that allow synthesis in the concentrated phase, minimizing or eliminating the use of solvents and thus intensifying the process. This "dry" process is possible in a kneader reactor.

== History ==
The Sigma kneader was developed by Heinz List, a pioneer of modern industrial processing technology. List recognized that processing in the concentrated phase with little to no solvent, also known as "dry processing", would increase process yield per unit volume and would therefore be more profitable. List developed the reactor to overcome the technical complexities of processing in the concentrated phase.

== Technology advantages ==
Kneader reactors offer a number of technological advantages for dry processing:

- Excellent mixing and kneading performance during wet, pasty and viscous phases
- Large working volume reactors efficiently handling large product volumes
- Large heat-exchange surface areas yielding highest possible surface-to-volume ratio
- Maximum self-cleaning
- Narrow residence-time distribution for plug flow operation
- Adaptive for a wide range of residence times
- Closed design for cleaner production environment
- Robust design for high viscosity processing
- Compact design maximizing process yield per performance volume and minimizing space requirement

Kneader reactor technology has long been used for what is known as “Process Intensification”, where multiple processing steps are performed in the same unit. Such units are characterized by high yield per performance volume and also have the flexibility to produce different grades and/or products.
