= 4,4'-Dihydroxybenzophenone =

4,4′-Dihydroxybenzophenone

Names
- Preferred IUPAC name Bis(4-hydroxyphenyl)methanone
- Other names Benzophenone, 4,4′-dihydroxy-(7Cl,8Cl); 4,4′-dihydroxydiphenyl ketone; Bis(4-hydroxyphenyl) ketone; HBP; HBP (ketone); NSC

Identifiers
| CAS Number | 611-99-4 |
| 3D model (JSmol) | Interactive image |
| ChEBI | CHEBI:34365 |
| ChEMBL | ChEMBL194859 |
| ChemSpider | 62365 |
| DrugBank | DB07635 |
| ECHA InfoCard | 100.009.354 |
| EC Number | 210-288-1 |
| KEGG | C14220 |
| PubChem CID | 69150 |
| UNII | HZR7D31SBY |
| CompTox Dashboard (EPA) | DTXSID1022425 |
- InChI: InChI=1S/C13H10O3/c14-11-5-1-9(2-6-11)13(16)10-3-7-12(15)8-4-10/h1-8,14-15H Key: RXNYJUSEXLAVNQ-UHFFFAOYSA-N; InChI=1/C13H10O3/c14-11-5-1-9(2-6-11)13(16)10-3-7-12(15)8-4-10/h1-8,14-15H Key: RXNYJUSEXLAVNQ-UHFFFAOYAR
- SMILES: O=C(c1ccc(O)cc1)c2ccc(O)cc2

Properties
| Chemical formula | C_{13}H_{10}O_{3} |
| Molar mass | 214.22 g/mol |
| Appearance | Off white/yellow solid |
| Density | 1.302g/cm3 |
| Melting point | 213 to 215 °C (415 to 419 °F; 486 to 488 K) |
| Boiling point | 444.8 °C (832.6 °F; 718.0 K) @760mmHg |
| Solubility in water | 0.45 g/L |

Hazards
- GHS labelling
| Pictograms | (GHS07: Exclamation mark) |
| Signal word | Warning |
| Hazard statements | H315, H317, H319, H335 |
| Precautionary statements | P261, P264, P271, P272, P280, P302+P352, P304+P340, P305+P351+P338, P312, P321, P332+P313, P333+P313, P337+P313, P362, P363, P403+P233, P405, P501 |
| Flash point | 237 °C (459 °F; 510 K) |
| Safety data sheet (SDS) | MSDS by Fisher Scientific |
- Except where otherwise noted, data are given for materials in their standard state (at 25 °C [77 °F], 100 kPa). verify (what is ?) Infobox references

4,4′-Dihydroxybenzophenone (DHBP) is an organic compound with the formula (HOC_{6}H_{4})_{2}CO. This off-white solid is a precursor to, or a degradation product of, diverse commercial materials. DHBP has a typical bisphenol structure. Like many other bisphenols and derivatives, it is a potential endocrine disruptor.

== Synthesis ==
4,4′-Dihydroxybenzophenone is prepared by the rearrangement of p-hydroxyphenylbenzoate:

HOC_{6}H_{4}CO_{2}C_{6}H_{5} → (HOC_{6}H_{4})_{2}CO

Alternatively, p-hydroxybenzoic acid can be converted to p-acetoxybenzoyl chloride. This acid chloride reacts with phenol to give, after deacetylation, 4,4′-dihydroxybenzophenone.

== Uses ==
The main application of 4,4′-dihydroxybenzophenone is as a UV light stabilizer. It and its derivatives are found in cosmetics, plastics, films, adhesives and coatings, optical fiber, and printed circuit boards. It is the precursor to certain polycarbonate polymers.
