= Diphenyl carbonate =

- Skeletal formula

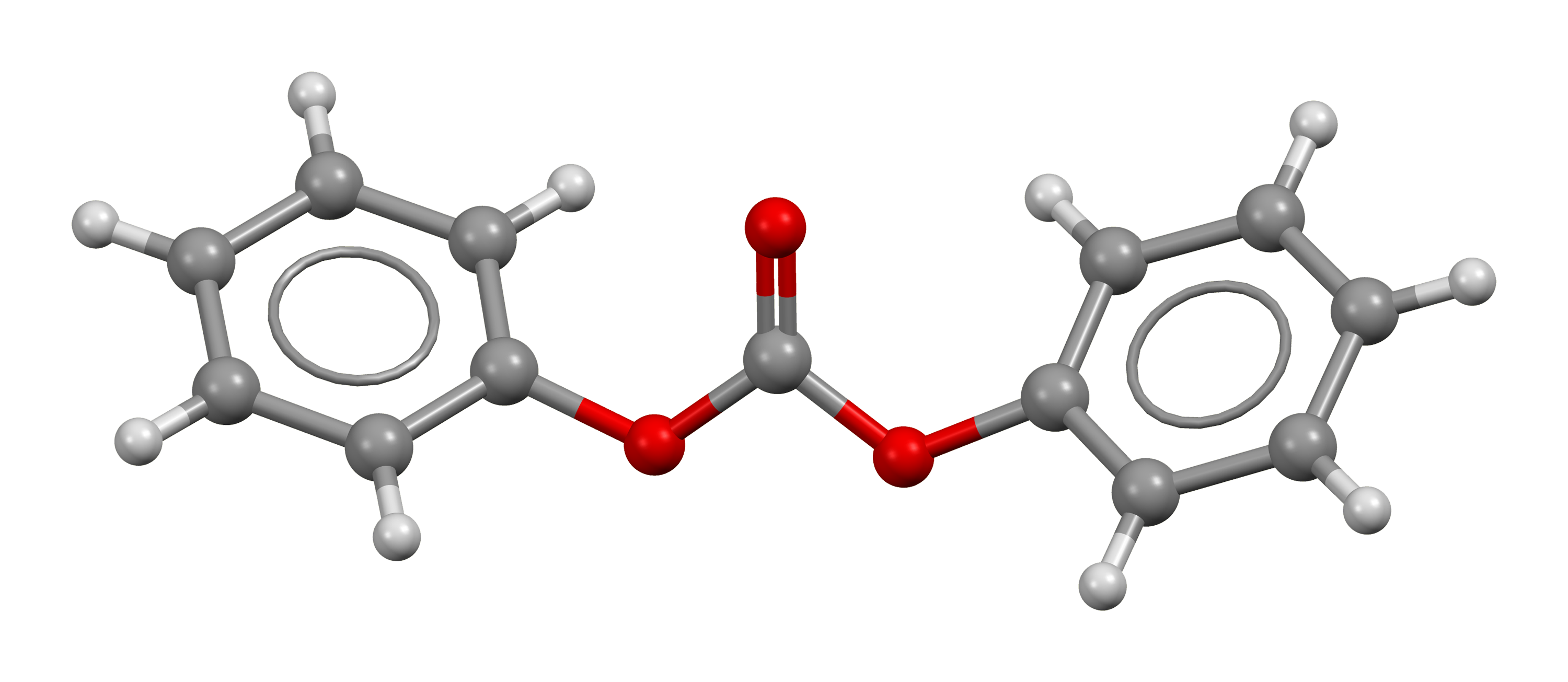
- Ball-and-stick model

Names
- Preferred IUPAC name Diphenyl carbonate
- Other names Phenyl carbonate, di-

Identifiers
| CAS Number | 102-09-0 = |
| 3D model (JSmol) | Interactive image |
| Abbreviations | Ph_{2}CO_{3} |
| ChEBI | CHEBI:34722 |
| ChemSpider | 7315 |
| ECHA InfoCard | 100.002.733 |
| KEGG | C14507 |
| PubChem CID | 7597 |
| UNII | YWV401IDYN |
| CompTox Dashboard (EPA) | DTXSID3020540 |
- InChI: InChI=1S/C13H10O3/c14-13(15-11-7-3-1-4-8-11)16-12-9-5-2-6-10-12/h1-10H Key: ROORDVPLFPIABK-UHFFFAOYSA-N; InChI=1/C13H10O3/c14-13(15-11-7-3-1-4-8-11)16-12-9-5-2-6-10-12/h1-10H Key: ROORDVPLFPIABK-UHFFFAOYAY
- SMILES: O=C(Oc1ccccc1)Oc2ccccc2

Properties
| Chemical formula | C_{13}H_{10}O_{3} |
| Molar mass | 214.220 g·mol^{−1} |
| Density | 1.1215 g/cm^{3} at 87 °C |
| Melting point | 80–81 °C (176–178 °F; 353–354 K) |
| Boiling point | 306 °C (583 °F; 579 K) |
| Solubility in water | insoluble |
| Solubility | soluble in ethanol, diethyl ether, carbon tetrachloride, acetic acid |

Hazards
- GHS labelling
| Pictograms | (GHS07: Exclamation mark) (GHS09: Environmental hazard) |
| Signal word | Warning |
| Hazard statements | H302, H410, H411 |
| Precautionary statements | P264, P270, P273, P301+P312, P330, P391, P501 |
- Except where otherwise noted, data are given for materials in their standard state (at 25 °C [77 °F], 100 kPa). verify (what is ?) Infobox references

Diphenyl carbonate is the organic compound with the formula (C_{6}H_{5}O)_{2}CO. It is classified as an acyclic carbonate ester. It is a colorless solid. It is both a monomer in combination with bisphenol A in the production of polycarbonate polymers and a product of the decomposition of polycarbonates.

== Production ==
World production capacity of diphenyl carbonate was 254,000 tonnes in 2002, and phosgenation of phenol is the most significant route. Phosgenation of phenol can proceed under various conditions. The net reaction is as follows:

2 PhOH + COCl_{2} → PhOCO_{2}Ph + 2 HCl

The use of phosgene can be avoided by the oxidative carbonylation of phenol with carbon monoxide:

2 PhOH + CO + [O] → PhOCO_{2}Ph + H_{2}O

Dimethyl carbonate can also be transesterified with phenol:

CH_{3}OCO_{2}CH_{3} + 2 PhOH → PhOCO_{2}Ph + 2 MeOH

The kinetics and thermodynamics of this reaction are not favorable. For example, at higher temperatures, dimethyl carbonate undesirably methylates phenol to give anisole. Despite this, diphenyl carbonate made from non-phosgene sources has become a widely used raw material for the synthesis of bisphenol-A-polycarbonate in a melt polycondensation process.

== Applications ==
Polycarbonates can be prepared by transesterifying diphenyl carbonate with bisphenol A. Phenol is a co-product. These polycarbonates may be recycled by reversing the process: transesterifying the polycarbonate with phenol to yield diphenyl carbonate and bisphenol A.
