= Hermann Josef Schnell =

Hermann Schnell
- Born: 16 September 1916; Gaienhofen, Germany
- Died: 8 September 1999 (aged 83); Gaienhofen, Germany
- Education: University of Freiburg
- Known for: Polycarbonates
- Awards: Hermann-Staudinger-Gedächtnismedaille (1970), Swinburne Award 1976
- Scientific career
- Fields: Polymer chemistry
- Workplaces: Bayer AG
- Doctoral advisor: Hermann Staudinger

Hermann Schnell ( 16. September March 1916 – 7 September 1999) was a German organic chemist who developed the first commercial polycarbonate, Makrolon. Hermann Schnell studied chemistry at the University of Freiberg. His supervisor was Hermann Staudinger a well-known polymer chemist.

After his phd he worked in the research laboratory of the Bayer AG in Uerdingen, starting in 1946. In 1953 he developed the synthesis of polycarbonates by reacting phosgene with bisphenol A. This material marketed as Makrolon was a commercial success.
