= Vinylene carbonate =

Names
- Preferred IUPAC name 2H-1,3-Dioxol-2-one
- Other names 1,3-Dioxolene-2-one; Vinyl carbonate

Identifiers
CAS Number	872-36-6
3D model (JSmol)	Interactive image
ChemSpider	12812
ECHA InfoCard	100.011.659
EC Number	212-825-5
PubChem CID	13385
UNII	1X0ZZF9WFV
CompTox Dashboard (EPA)	DTXSID1074888
- InChI: InChI=1S/C3H2O3/c4-3-5-1-2-6-3/h1-2H Key: VAYTZRYEBVHVLE-UHFFFAOYSA-N
- SMILES: C1=COC(=O)O1

Properties
Chemical formula	C_{3}H_{2}O_{3}
Molar mass	86.05 g·mol^{−1}
Appearance	colourless liquid
Density	1.35
Melting point	22 °C (72 °F; 295 K)
Boiling point	178 °C (352 °F; 451 K)

Hazards
- GHS labelling
Pictograms	(GHS05: Corrosive) (GHS06: Toxic) (GHS07: Exclamation mark) (GHS08: Health hazard) (GHS09: Environmental hazard)
Signal word	Danger
Hazard statements	H302, H311, H315, H317, H318, H373, H411
Precautionary statements	P260, P264, P270, P272, P273, P280, P301+P312, P302+P352, P305+P351+P338, P310, P312, P314, P321, P322, P330, P332+P313, P333+P313, P361, P362, P363, P391, P405, P501
- Except where otherwise noted, data are given for materials in their standard state (at 25 °C [77 °F], 100 kPa). Infobox references

Vinylene carbonate (VC) or 1,3-dioxol-2-one, is the simplest unsaturated cyclic carbonic acid ester. Vinylene carbonate can also be thought of as the cyclic carbonate of the hypothetical (Z)-ethene-1,2-diol. The activated double bond in this five-membered oxygen-containing heterocycle makes the molecule a reactive monomer for homopolymerization and copolymerization and a dienophile in Diels-Alder reactions. Below room temperature vinylene carbonate is a colorless stable solid.

== Preparation ==
Since its first description in 1953, ethylene carbonate has been commonly used as starting material for vinylene carbonate. In the first stage, monochlorethylene carbonate is produced in a UV-initiated photochlorination reaction with chlorine or sulfuryl chloride at 60-70 °C in bulk. In the second stage, monochlorethylenecarbonate undergoes dehydrochlorination with a base such as triethylamine.

Instead of in the liquid phase, the dehydrochlorination may also be carried out in the gas phase on a zinc chloride impregnated catalyst in a fluidized bed reactor at 350-500 °C. The seemingly simple reaction yields only 70 to 80% of impure end product due to a variety of side reactions. For example, in the chlorination of ethylene carbonate in substance or solution, 2-chloroacetaldehyde, polychlorinated ethylene carbonate and chlorinated ring-opening products are formed besides others. The separation of the by-products from the final product by distillation by thin-film evaporator, fractional recrystallization or zone melting is very expensive. The content of by-products can be reduced by stirring with sodium borohydride or urea at elevated temperature. However, the purification is complicated by the pronounced thermolability of vinylene carbonate, as it decomposes at temperatures above 80 °C within minutes. Highly pure vinylene carbonate can be obtained in yields of more than 70% by optimizing the chlorination conditions to suppress the formation of by-products and a combination of several gentle purification processes. The tendency of the liquid vinylene carbonate to polymerize is suppressed by addition of inhibitors such as butylhydroxytoluene (BHT).

== Properties ==
Industrially produced vinylene carbonate is usually a yellow to brown liquid. By suitable process control and purification steps, a solid product with a melting point of 20-22 °C and a chlorine content below 10ppm can be obtained. Liquid vinylene carbonate turns rapidly yellow even in the absence of light and must be stabilized by the addition of radical scavengers. In solid form, the highly pure substance is long-term stable when stored below 10 °C. Vinylene carbonate dissolves in a variety of solvents such as ethanol, tetrahydrofuran, ethylene carbonate, propylene carbonate, and other dipolar aprotic electrolyte solvents used for lithium ion rechargeable batteries such as dimethyl carbonate, diethyl carbonate and the like.

== Use ==
The first publication on vinylene carbonate described its Diels-Alder reaction using the example of its addition reaction with 2,3-dimethylbutadiene to a bicyclic carbonate and subsequent hydrolysis to cis-4,5-dihydroxy-1,2-cyclohexene:

When cyclopentadiene is used as the diene, the vicinal norbornene diol bicyclo[2.2.1]hept-5-ene-2,3-diol is formed after hydrolysis. The Swern oxidation to the 1,2-ketone bicyclo[2.2.1]hept-5-ene-2,3-dione proceeds (in the variant with trifluoroacetic anhydride instead of oxalyl chloride) with a yield of 73%.

Under UV irradiation, ketones react with vinylene carbonate to form bicyclic exo-oxetanes:

With phosphorus(V)sulfide, vinylene carbonate reacts to the corresponding vinylenethionocarbonate (2-thiono-1,3-dioxol-4-ene), which gives ketene in quantitative yield upon UV irradiation. The reaction is a good alternative to the decomposition of α-diazoketones.

Vinylene carbonate is used widely as an electrolyte additive for lithium-ion batteries where it promotes the formation of an insoluble film between the electrolyte and the negative electrode: the SEI (solid-electrolyte-interface). This polymer film allows ionic conduction, but prevents the reduction of the electrolyte at the negative (graphite) electrode and contributes significantly to the long-term stability of lithium-ion batteries. A 2013 publication suggests that the cyclic sultone 3-fluoro-1,3-propanesultone (FPS) is superior to vinylene carbonate in SEI formation.

Since 1,3-propane sultone (on which FPS is based) is classified as a particularly dangerous carcinogenic substance, a significant hazard potential must also be assumed for FPS.

=== Polymers ===
Already the first work on vinylene carbonate describes its bulk polymerization a colorless polymer, which hydrolyzes to a water-soluble product. Subsequent publications suggest that the first authors produced only low molecular weight oligomers. The preparation of higher molecular weight polymers with useful properties depends critically on the purity of the vinylene carbonate monomer. Vinylene carbonate can be homopolymerized in bulk, in solution, in suspension and in dispersion using radical initiators such as azobis(isobutyronitrile) (AIBN) or benzoyl peroxide. It can also be copolymerized with other vinyl monomers such as vinyl pyrrolidone or vinyl propionate.

Polyvinylene carbonate is readily soluble in acetone and dimethylformamide. The solutions obtained, however, tend to decompose already at room temperature. The patent literature describes the use of polyvinyl carbonate for strong fibers, clear, colorless and mechanically strong films, membranes for reverse osmosis and as support during affinity chromatography.

In addition to the instability in solutions, polyvinyl carbonate has the tendency towards hydrolysis in weakly alkaline medium. This forms polyhydroxymethylene (PHM) via cleavage of the cyclic carbon ring, with the repeating unit –(CHOH)–. Its behavior is much more similar to cellulose than to the structurally related polyvinyl alcohol with the repeating unit –(CH_{2}–CHOH)–.

For example, polyhydroxymethylene films obtained by alkaline hydrolysis of polyvinylene carbonate films via sodium methoxide in methanol are crystalline and exhibit high tensile strengths. Analogous to cellulose, polyhydroxymethylene can be dissolved in hot sodium hydroxide solution and converted by crosslinking into a highly swellable polymer which can take up to 10,000 times its weight in water. Polyhydroxymethylene is soluble in anhydrous hydrazine and can be converted into cellulose-like fibers by spinning in water. Similar to cellulose, polyhydroxymethylene reacts with carbon disulfide in the alkaline state to form a xanthate, from which water-insoluble polyhydroxymethylene is again obtained by precipitation in dilute sulfuric acid.

== Safety ==
Vinylene carbonate requires particular care when handling because of its problematic toxicological and ecotoxicological profile.
