= Tetrachloroethylene carbonate =

Names
- IUPAC name 4,4,5,5-tetrachloro-1,3-dioxolan-2-one
- Other names Perchloroethylene carbonate, tetrachloro-1,3-dioxolan-2-one

Identifiers
CAS Number	22432-68-4
3D model (JSmol)	Interactive image
ChemSpider	2007092
EC Number	404-060-2
PubChem CID	2724978
CompTox Dashboard (EPA)	DTXSID40176970
- InChI: InChI=1S/C3Cl4O3/c4-2(5)3(6,7)10-1(8)9-2 Key: TXQPIYKVIOKFAB-UHFFFAOYSA-N
- SMILES: C1(=O)OC(C(O1)(Cl)Cl)(Cl)Cl

Properties
Chemical formula	C_{3}Cl_{4}O_{3}
Molar mass	225.83 g·mol^{−1}
Density	1.81

Hazards
- GHS labelling
Pictograms	(GHS05: Corrosive) (GHS06: Toxic) (GHS07: Exclamation mark)
Signal word	Danger
Hazard statements	H302, H314, H330
Precautionary statements	P260, P264, P270, P271, P280, P284, P301+P317, P301+P330+P331, P302+P361+P354, P304+P340, P305+P354+P338, P316, P320, P321, P330, P363, P403+P233, P405, P501
- Except where otherwise noted, data are given for materials in their standard state (at 25 °C [77 °F], 100 kPa). Infobox references

Tetrachloroethylene carbonate is a carbonate ester with the chemical formula C_{2}Cl_{4}O_{2}CO. It is produced by the photochlorination of ethylene carbonate. It has been used as precursor for oxalyl chloride.

Tetrachloroethylene carbonate acts as a Lewis base and it forms a complex with the Lewis acid antimony pentachloride. Tetrachloroethylene carbonate reacts with tributylamine, forming phosgene.

== See also ==
- Tetrachloroethylene
- Tetrachloroethylene oxide
