= C2H4N2O2 =

The molecular formula C_{2}H_{4}N_{2}O_{2} may refer to:

- 1,2-Diformylhydrazine, chemical compound with the formula N_{2}H_{2}(CHO)_{2}
- Oxamide, organic compound with the formula (CONH_{2})_{2}
