= Oxalyl chloride =

- Oxalyl chloride

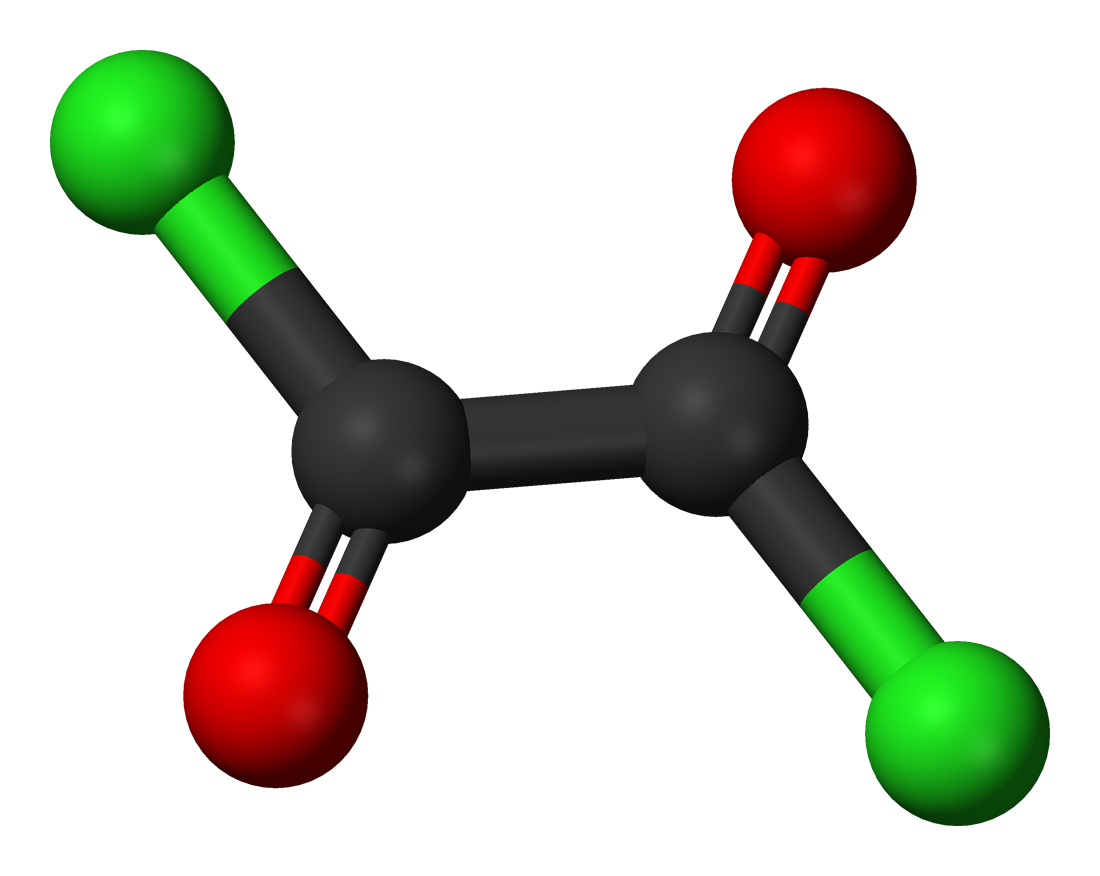

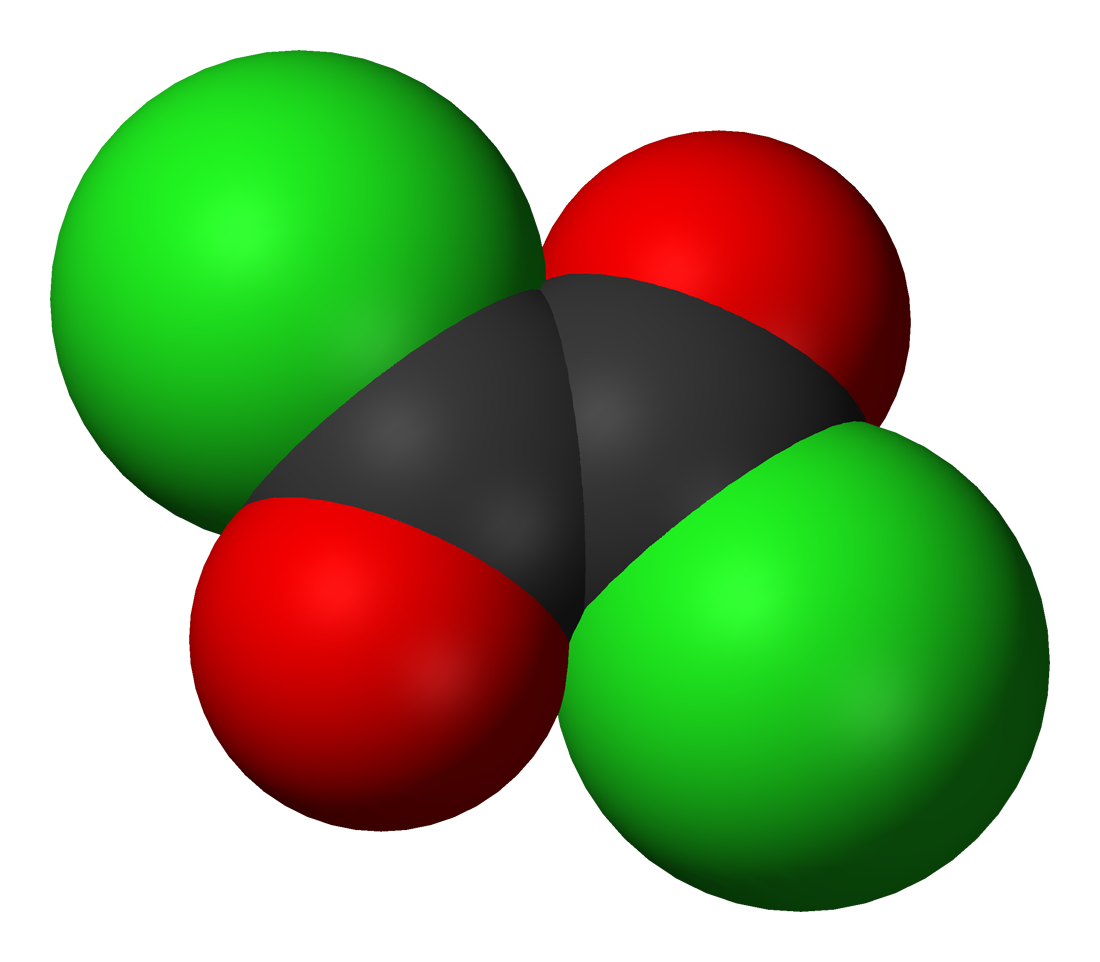
Carbon, C
Oxygen, O
Chlorine, Cl
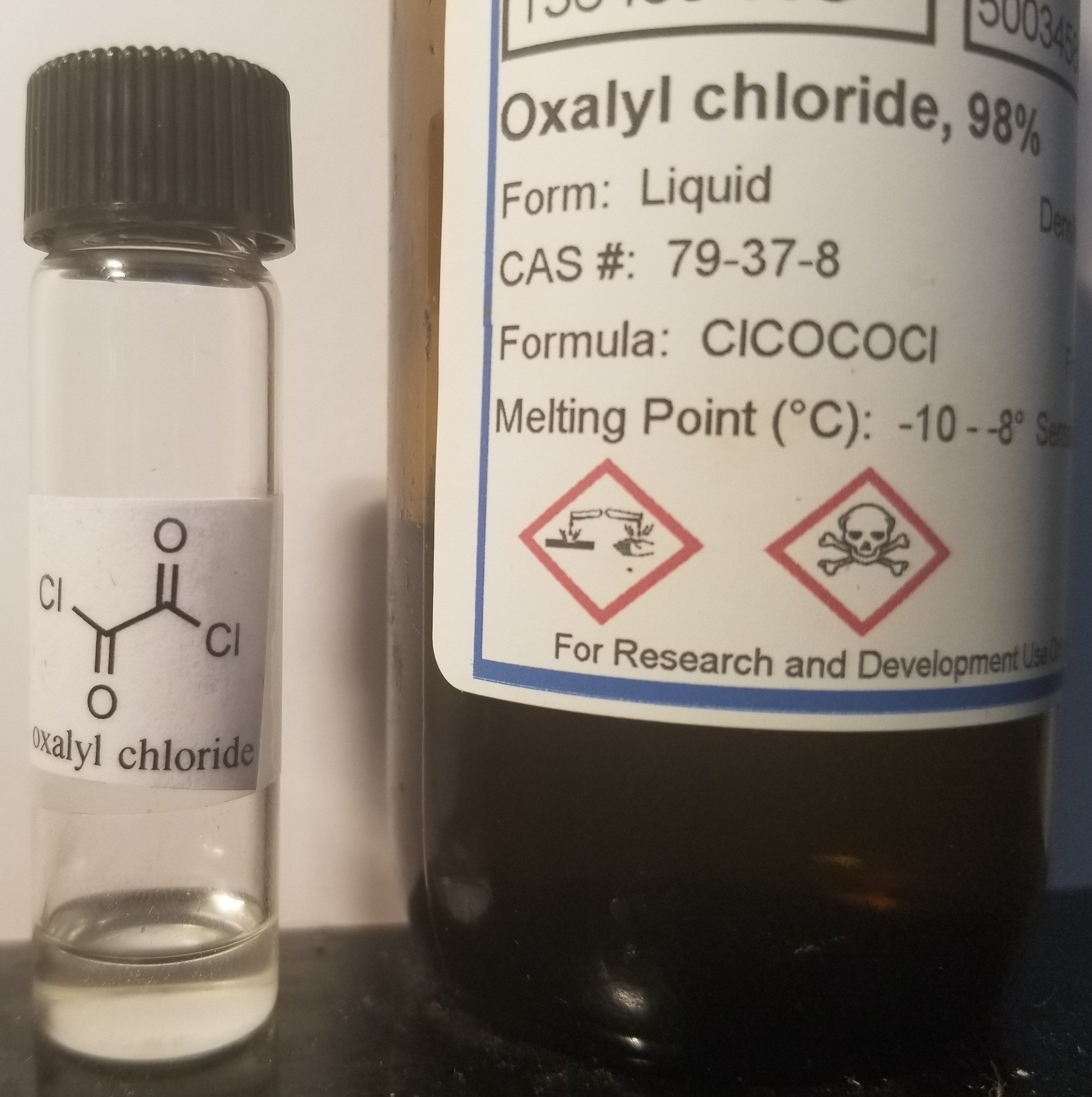

Names
- Preferred IUPAC name Oxalyl dichloride
- Systematic IUPAC name Ethanedioyl dichloride
- Other names: Oxalic acid chloride; Oxalic acid dichloride (1:2); Oxalic dichloride; Oxaloyl chloride

Identifiers
CAS Number	79-37-8
3D model (JSmol)	Interactive image
ChemSpider	59021
ECHA InfoCard	100.001.092
EC Number	201-200-2
PubChem CID	65578
RTECS number	KI2950000
UNII	R4Y96317DW
CompTox Dashboard (EPA)	DTXSID3058822
- InChI: InChI=1S/C2Cl2O2/c3-1(5)2(4)6 Key: CTSLXHKWHWQRSH-UHFFFAOYSA-N; InChI=1/C2Cl2O2/c3-1(5)2(4)6 Key: CTSLXHKWHWQRSH-UHFFFAOYAG
- SMILES: ClC(=O)C(=O)Cl

Properties
Chemical formula	C_{2}O_{2}Cl_{2}
Molar mass	126.92 g·mol^{−1}
Appearance	Colorless liquid
Odor	Phosgene-like
Density	1.4785 g/mL
Melting point	−16 °C (3 °F; 257 K)
Boiling point	63 to 64 °C (145 to 147 °F; 336 to 337 K) at 1.017 bar
Solubility in water	Reacts
Refractive index (n_{D})	1.429

Hazards
- Occupational safety and health (OHS/OSH)
Main hazards	Toxic, corrosive, lachrymator
- GHS labelling
Pictograms	(GHS06: Toxic) (GHS05: Corrosive)
Signal word	Danger
Hazard statements	H314, H331
Precautionary statements	P261, P280, P305+P351+P338, P310
NFPA 704 (fire diamond)	3 1 2 W
Safety data sheet (SDS)	External MSDS

Related compounds
Related acyl chlorides	Malonyl chloride; Succinyl chloride; Phosgene
Related compounds	Oxalic acid; Diethyl oxalate; Oxamide; Oxalyl hydrazide; Cuprizon 1
- Except where otherwise noted, data are given for materials in their standard state (at 25 °C [77 °F], 100 kPa). verify (what is ?) Infobox references

Oxalyl chloride is an organic chemical compound with the formula Cl−C(=O)−C(=O)−Cl. This colorless, sharp-smelling liquid, the diacyl chloride of oxalic acid, is a useful reagent in organic synthesis.

== Preparation ==
Oxalyl chloride was first prepared in 1892 by the French chemist Adrien Fauconnier, who treated diethyl oxalate with phosphorus pentachloride. It can also be prepared by treating oxalic acid with phosphorus pentachloride.

Oxalyl chloride is produced commercially from ethylene carbonate. Photochlorination gives the perchloroethylene carbonate C_{2}Cl_{4}O_{2}CO and hydrogen chloride HCl, which is subsequently degraded to oxalyl chloride and phosgene COCl_{2}:

C_{2}H_{4}O_{2}CO + 4 Cl_{2} → C_{2}Cl_{4}O_{2}CO + 4 HCl
C_{2}Cl_{4}O_{2}CO → C_{2}O_{2}Cl_{2} + COCl_{2}

== Reactions ==
As originally determined by Staudinger, oxalyl chloride reacts with water giving off gaseous products only: hydrogen chloride (HCl), carbon dioxide (CO_{2}), and carbon monoxide (CO).

(COCl)_{2} + H_{2}O → 2 HCl + CO_{2} + CO

Other acyl chlorides hydrolyze with formation of hydrogen chloride and the original carboxylic acid.

== Applications in organic synthesis ==
=== Oxidation of alcohols ===
Addition of a primary or secondary alcohol to a solution of oxalyl chloride in DMSO, followed by quenching with an organic base such as triethylamine converts alcohols to the corresponding aldehydes and ketones via the process known as the Swern oxidation.

=== Synthesis of acyl chlorides ===
Oxalyl chloride is mainly used together with a N,N-dimethylformamide catalyst in organic synthesis for the preparation of acyl chlorides from the corresponding carboxylic acids. Like thionyl chloride, the reagent degrades into volatile side products in this application, which simplifies workup. One of the minor byproducts from the N,N-dimethylformamide catalyzed reaction, dimethylcarbamoyl chloride, is a potent carcinogen, stemming from the N,N-dimethylformamide decomposition. Relative to thionyl chloride, oxalyl chloride tends to be a milder, more selective reagent. It is also more expensive than thionyl chloride so it tends to be used on a smaller scale.

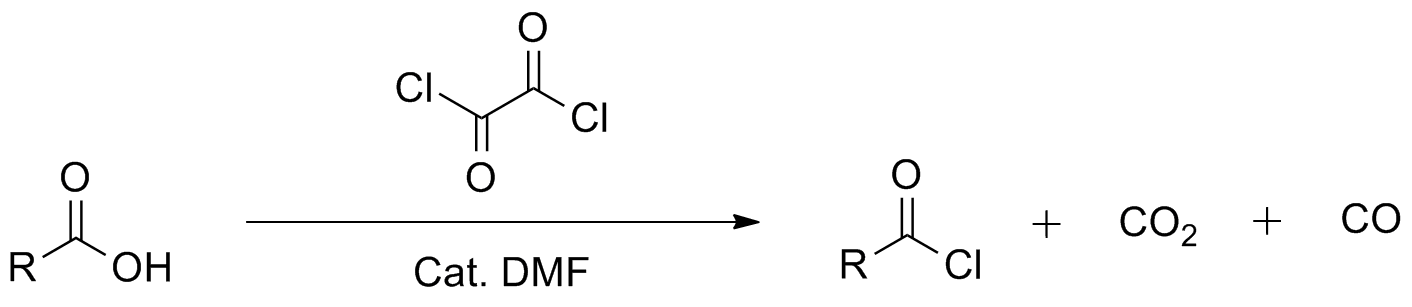

This reaction involves conversion of N,N-dimethylformamide to the imidoyl chloride derivative (chloromethylene(dimethyl)ammonium ion (CH_{3})_{2}N^{+}=CHCl), akin to the first stage in the Vilsmeier–Haack reaction. The imidoyl chloride is the active chlorinating agent.

=== Addition of carboxylic acid groups to arenes ===
Oxalyl chloride reacts with aromatic compounds in the presence of aluminium chloride to give the corresponding acyl chloride in a process known as a Friedel-Crafts acylation. The resulting acyl chloride can be hydrolysed to form the corresponding carboxylic acid.

=== Preparation of oxalate diesters ===
Like other acyl chlorides, oxalyl chloride reacts with alcohols to give esters:

2 R−CH_{2}−OH + Cl−C(=O)−C(=O)Cl → R−CH_{2}−O−C(=O)−C(=O)−O−CH_{2}−R + 2 HCl

Typically, such reactions are conducted in the presence of a base such as pyridine. The diester derived from phenol, phenyl oxalate ester, is Cyalume, the active ingredient in glow sticks.

A similar reaction occurs with amines to give substituted oxalamides:

2 R−NH_{2} + ClC(=O)−C(=O)Cl → R−NH−C(=O)−C(=O)−NH−R + 2 HCl

=== Other ===
Oxalyl chloride was reportedly used in the first synthesis of dioxane tetraketone (C_{4}O_{6}), an oxide of carbon.

== Precautions ==
In March 2000, a Malaysia Airlines Airbus A330-300 was damaged beyond repair after a cargo of prohibited oxalyl chloride (falsely declared as hydroxyquinoline) leaked into the cargo bay. It is toxic by inhalation, although it is over an order of magnitude less acutely toxic than the related compound phosgene.

== See also ==
- Oxalyl
- Swern oxidation
