= C3H2O3 =

The molecular formula C_{3}H_{2}O_{3} may refer to:

- Deltic acid, chemical substance; a ketone and double alcohol of cyclopropene
- Malonic anhydride, an organic compound; the anhydride of malonic acid, or a double ketone of oxetane
- Vinylene carbonate, simplest unsaturated cyclic carbonic acid ester
