= Lukanin =

Lukanin (masculine, Russian: Луканин) or Lukanina (feminine, Russian: Луканина) is a Russian surname. Notable people with the surname include:

- Adelaida Lukanina (1843–1908), Russian physician and chemist
- Igor Lukanin (born 1976), Azerbaijani ice dancer
- Ninel Lukanina, Russian Soviet volleyball player
