= DEPC =

DEPC can refer to:

- Diethylpyrocarbonate, a chemical used in the laboratory to inactivate RNAse enzymes
- 1,2-Erucoyl-sn-Glycero-3-phosphocholine, a phospholipid
