= PTMC =

PTMC may refer to:

- Parents Television and Media Council, American media advocacy group
- Poly(trimethylene carbonate), an organic polymer
- Post Terran Mining Corporation, a fictional company in Descent (video game)
