= PPC =

PPC may refer to:

== Computing and telecommunications ==
- Personal programmable calculator, programmable calculators for personal use
- PowerPC, a microprocessor architecture
- PearPC, a PowerPC platform emulator
- Protected procedure call, a messaging facility in computer operating systems
- ZEOS PPC, an early MS-DOS 5.0-based palmtop PC by ZEOS
- Pocket PC, Microsoft's specification for handheld devices
- Peripheral pin controller, a feature present in the StrongARM CPU family that controls IO ports
- Peercoin, a peer-to-peer cryptocurrency
- Pay-per-click, an internet advertising model
- PPC worldwide, a U.S.-based manufacturer of connector technology for the telecommunications, broadcast and wireless industries

== Business ==
- Production Possibility Curve, a graph that shows the different quantities of two goods that an economy could efficiently produce with limited productive resources
- Prompt Payment Code, a voluntary code of practice for businesses
- Practitioners Publishing Company, an imprint of Thomson Reuters Tax & Accounting

== Government and politics ==
=== Political parties ===
- Partido del Pueblo Costarricense, the Costa Rican People's Party
- Partido de los Pueblos Costeños, a regional political party in Nicaragua
- Partido Popular Cristiano (Peru) (Christian People's Party), a Peruvian political party
- Partit Popular de Catalunya, the Catalan branch of People's Party, Spain
- Party for Progress and Concord, Rwanda
- People's Party of Canada, a conservative party founded by Maxime Bernier
- Pirate Party of Canada

=== Other uses in government and politics ===
- Pakistan Penal Code
- Peoples Planning Campaign (People's Plan Campaign), the Kerala experiment in decentralisation of powers to local governments
- Prospective parliamentary candidate, a role in politics in the United Kingdom
- Poor People's Campaign founded by Martin Luther King Jr.

== Medicine, chemistry, transportation, sports, firearms, and entertainment ==
The entries are grouped and ordered in correspondence with the terms in the heading.

- Pediatric Prehospital Care, an educational program offered by the National Association of Emergency Medical Technicians
- Primary peritoneal carcinoma
- Posterior parietal cortex, an association area involved in the integration of sensory information from multiple modalities
- Proprotein convertase, an enzyme family
- 4-Phenyl-4-(1-piperidinyl)cyclohexanol, an organic chemical
- Polypropylene carbonate, a plastic
- PPC Ltd., a South African cement producer
- Partially premixed combustion, a modern combustion process intended to be used in internal combustion engines
- Premium Platform Combustion, an automotive platform by Volkswagen Group
- Powered parachute or paraplane, a type of aircraft
- Ppc Racing, a defunct NASCAR team
- Precision pistol competition, a type of target shooting competition
- 6mm PPC (Palmisano & Pindel Cartridge), a family of centerfire rifle cartridges for benchrest shooting sports
- Particle projection cannon, a fictional weapon in the BattleTech universe
- Peg + Cat, a TV series
- Pink Pony Club, a 2020 single from Chappell Roan
- Psychedelic Porn Crumpets, a rock band from Australia

== Other uses ==
- Petits Propos Culinaires, a journal of food studies and history
- Presbyterian Publishing Corporation, a publishing agency of the American Presbyterian Church
- Prior Park College, a Catholic private school in Bath, England
- Public Power Corporation (Δημόσια Επιχείρηση Ηλεκτρισμού), a Greek electric power company

== See also ==
- PPC-1 (Pipe Pacific Cable), an international communications link constructed by PIPE Networks
- PPCS (disambiguation)
