= Ethylene carbonate =

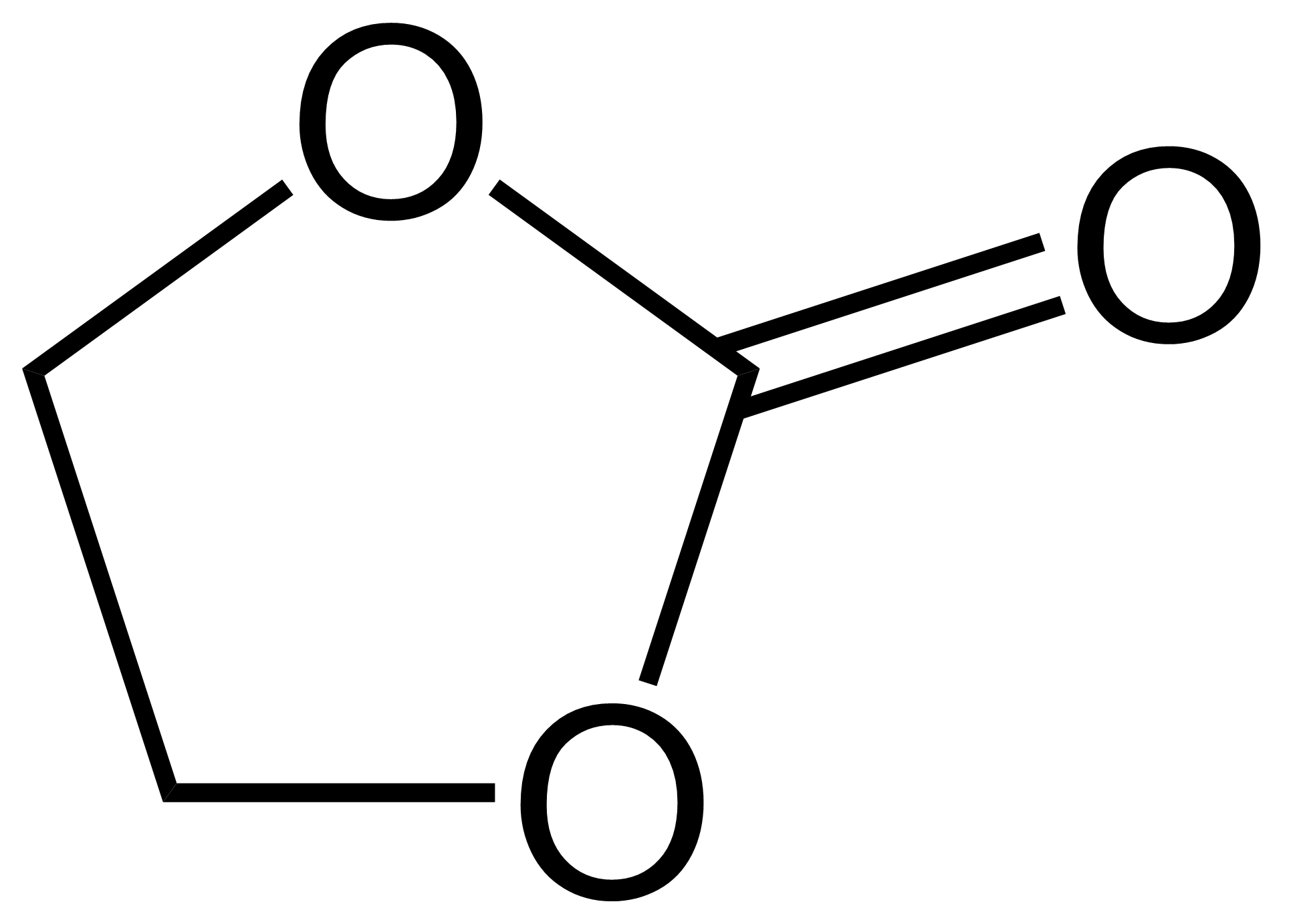

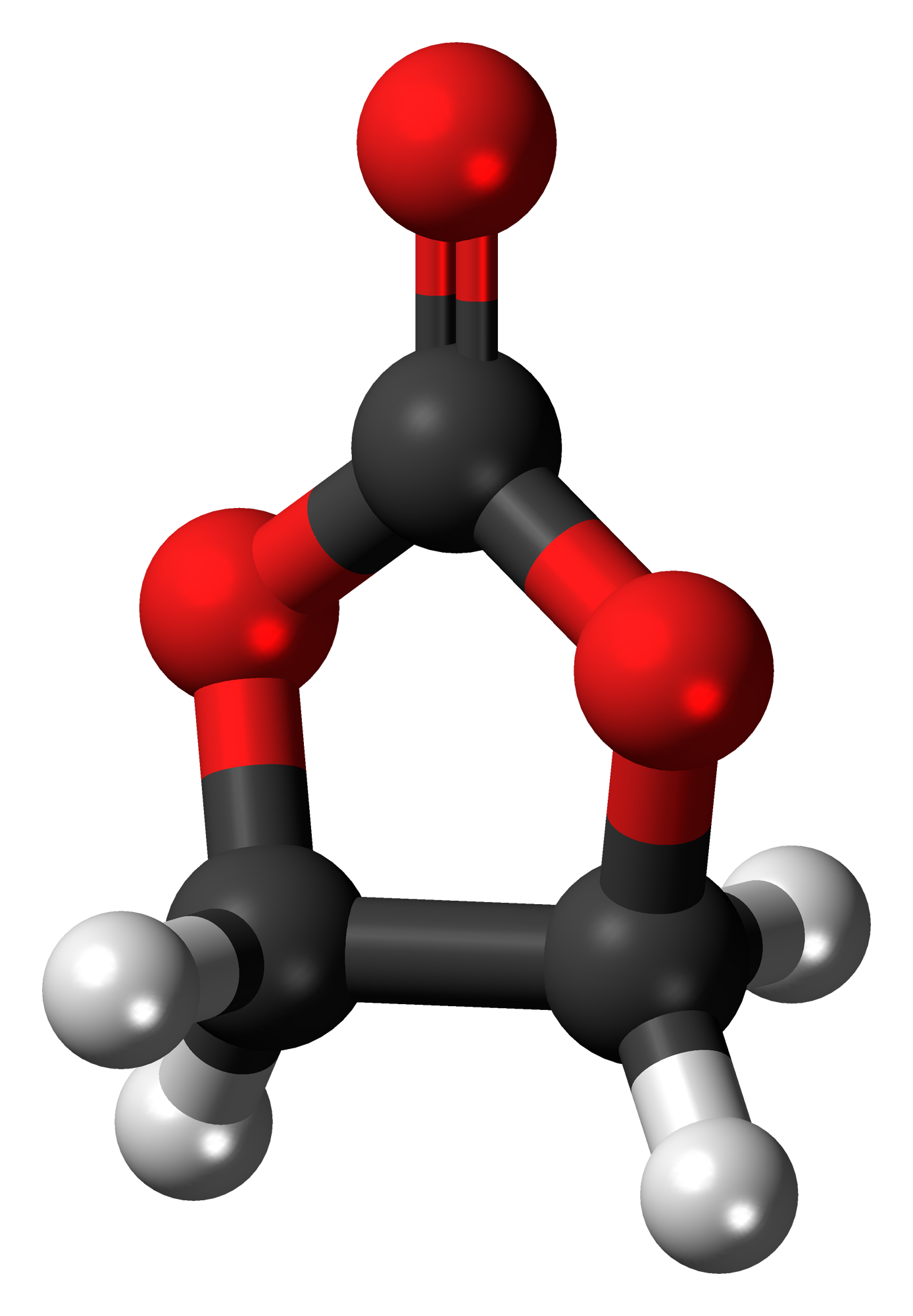

Names
- Preferred IUPAC name 1,3-Dioxolan-2-one
- Other names ethylene glycol carbonate

Identifiers
CAS Number	96-49-1
3D model (JSmol)	Interactive image
ChEBI	CHEBI:178725
ChEMBL	ChEMBL3181803
ChemSpider	7030
ECHA InfoCard	100.002.283
EC Number	202-510-0
KEGG	C20363
PubChem CID	7303
UNII	RGJ96TB7R7
CompTox Dashboard (EPA)	DTXSID2026600
- InChI: InChI=1S/C3H4O3/c4-3-5-1-2-6-3/h1-2H2 Key: KMTRUDSVKNLOMY-UHFFFAOYSA-N; InChI=1/C3H4O3/c4-3-5-1-2-6-3/h1-2H2 Key: KMTRUDSVKNLOMY-UHFFFAOYAD
- SMILES: C1COC(=O)O1

Properties
Chemical formula	C_{3}H_{4}O_{3}
Molar mass	88.062 g·mol^{−1}
Appearance	White to yellow solid
Density	1.3210 g/cm^{3}
Melting point	34 to 37 °C (93 to 99 °F; 307 to 310 K)
Boiling point	243.0 °C (469.4 °F; 516.1 K)
Solubility in water	Soluble

Hazards
- GHS labelling
Pictograms	(GHS07: Exclamation mark) (GHS08: Health hazard)
Signal word	Warning
Hazard statements	H302, H319, H373
Precautionary statements	P260, P264, P270, P271, P280, P301+P312, P302+P352, P304+P340, P305+P351+P338, P310, P312, P314, P321, P330, P332+P313, P337+P313, P362, P403+P233, P405, P501
Flash point	150 °C (302 °F; 423 K)
Autoignition temperature	465 °C (869 °F; 738 K)
Safety data sheet (SDS)	External MSDS

Related compounds
Related compounds	Propylene carbonate; Vinylene carbonate; Diethyl carbonate; Trimethylene carbonate; Ethylene trithiocarbonate
- Except where otherwise noted, data are given for materials in their standard state (at 25 °C [77 °F], 100 kPa). verify (what is ?) Infobox references

Ethylene carbonate (sometimes abbreviated EC) is the organic compound with the formula (CH_{2}O)_{2}CO. It is classified as the cyclic carbonate ester of ethylene glycol and carbonic acid. At room temperature (25 °C) ethylene carbonate is a transparent crystalline solid, practically odorless and colorless, and somewhat soluble in water. In the liquid state (m.p. 34-37 °C) it is a colorless odorless liquid.

== Production and reactions ==
Ethylene carbonate is produced by the reaction between ethylene oxide and carbon dioxide. The reaction is catalyzed by a variety of cations and complexes:

(CH_{2})_{2}O + CO_{2} → (CH_{2}O)_{2}CO

In the laboratory, ethylene carbonate can also be produced from the reaction of urea and ethylene glycol using zinc oxide as a catalyst at a temperature of 150 °C and a pressure of 3 kPa:

(NH_{2})_{2}CO + HO−CH_{2}CH_{2}−OH → (CH_{2}O)_{2}CO + 2 NH_{3}

Ethylene carbonate (and propylene carbonate) may be converted to dimethyl carbonate (a useful solvent and a mild methylating agent) via transesterification by methanol:

C_{2}H_{4}CO_{3} + 2 CH_{3}OH → CH_{3}OCO_{2}CH_{3} + HOC_{2}H_{4}OH

The transesterification of ethylene carbonate by methanol can be catalyzed by a high surface area (thermally exfoliated) graphitic carbon nitride (g-C_{3}N_{4)} materials. This method reduces the chance of metal or halide contamination, and can offer yields of up to 60% at a temperature of 393 K.

Dimethyl carbonate may itself be similarly transesterified to diphenyl carbonate, a phosgene-substitute:

CH_{3}OCO_{2}CH_{3} + 2 PhOH → PhOCO_{2}Ph + 2 MeOH

== Applications ==
Ethylene carbonate is used as a polar solvent with a molecular dipole moment of 4.9 D, only 0.1 D lower than that of propylene carbonate.

It can be used as a high permittivity component of electrolytes in lithium batteries and lithium-ion batteries. Other components like diethyl carbonate, ethyl methyl carbonate, dimethyl carbonate and methyl acetate can be added to those electrolytes in order to decrease the viscosity and melting point.

Ethylene carbonate was a universal component of an electrolyte in earlier (prior to ca. 2010) lithium-ion batteries, since it is responsible for the formation of the solid electrolyte interphase on the anode. Since EC is solid at room temperature, it was mixed with propylene carbonate. As dimethylcarbonate and other dialkylcarbonates became commercially available, they replaced ethylene carbonate in some modern lithium-ion batteries.

A typical sodium intercalation type battery would use an electrolyte consisting of: fluoroethylene carbonate (FEC) (99%), metallic Na (99.9%), and 1.0 M sodium perchlorate (NaClO_{4}) solutions in ethylene carbonate and diethyl carbonate (EC/DEC), 1:1 v/v% battery-grade, mixed with FEC (10% by weight).

Ethylene carbonate is also used as plasticizer, and as a precursor to vinylene carbonate, which is used in polymers and in organic synthesis.

Oxalyl chloride is produced commercially from ethylene carbonate. Photochlorination gives the tetrachloroethylene carbonate:

C_{2}H_{4}O_{2}CO + 4 Cl_{2} → C_{2}Cl_{4}O_{2}CO + 4 HCl

The tetrachloride is degraded to oxalyl chloride by amine catalysts.

C_{2}Cl_{4}O_{2}CO → C_{2}O_{2}Cl_{2} + COCl_{2}

== See also ==
- Carbonate ester
