= Adelaida Lukanina =

Russian physician and chemist

Adelaida N. Lukanina (née Rykacheva, later Paevskaia; 1843–1908) was a Russian medical doctor and chemist known for her chemical research and for being an early woman physician in the United States.

== Life ==
Lukanina was born in Russia and lived in rural Novgorod Oblast, a setting that influenced her later writing. She originally studied to be a teacher, but then began studies in chemistry with the goal of becoming a physician. Not much else is known about her early life. In collaboration with Aleksandr Borodin, a Russian composer and chemist, she discovered that albumen could be oxidized to produce urea and corrected Heinrich Limpricht's incorrect elucidation of succinyl chloride's reaction with benzoin. During this time, she entered a marriage of convenience with a shopkeeper named Iulii Lukanin.

After her chemical research, Lukanina became a political activist in the Russian Empire and was arrested, then moved to the Grand Duchy of Finland, also part of the Russian Empire, to attend the University of Helsinki in its first co-ed year, 1870. In 1872 she moved to Zurich to attend the University of Zurich medical school. While in Switzerland she continued her political activism and sacrificed a future career in the Russian Empire to stay there, defying Tsar Aleksandr II's orders for women to leave Switzerland or be banned from a career in medicine. In 1875, she moved to the United States to finish medical school, having only a dissertation remaining in her M.D. requirements.

Lukanina earned her M.D. from the Woman's Medical College of Pennsylvania in 1876 and worked for a time at the New England Hospital for Women and Children, where she was known for her medical writing and her semi-autobiographical fiction. After her graduation, she returned to Europe and published a series telling stories from the United States in a liberal Saint Petersburg outlet. From 1877 to 1885, she lived in Paris in exile, waiting to be cleared of suspicion by the Russian Empire government. While there, she continued to publish her fiction and translated for a living. Her notable works during this period include "Liubushka" (1878), "Olden-day Matters" (four parts, 1880–1887), and "Ward #103" (1879). "Liubushka" and "Olden-day Matters" were semi-autobiographical expositions on rural life in Novgorod; whereas "Ward #103" told of Lukanina's experiences treating sex workers as a physician in Zurich.

Lukanina returned to the Russian Empire in 1885 but was not allowed to practice medicine until 1892, when cholera swept the western part of the Russian Empire and women physicians were pressed into service to treat rural villagers. She wrote of her experiences in "Journey to the Cholera Epidemic" (1902), discussing the living situation of the peasants she treated. During the 1890s Lukanina married again, becoming Adelaida Paevskaia, but this marriage ended in 1894 or 1895 and she became a shopkeeper as well as a physician, hiring poor women whom she treated, taught, and housed. She died in 1908 after a long illness.
