= PPCS =

PPCS may refer to:

- PPCS (gene)
- Persistent post concussion syndrome
- PictureParentControlSet, a data structure in AV1 reference codec
- Silver Fern Farms, formerly known as PPCS Limited (the Primary Producers Cooperative Society)

== See also ==
- PPC (disambiguation)
