= Trimethylene carbonate =

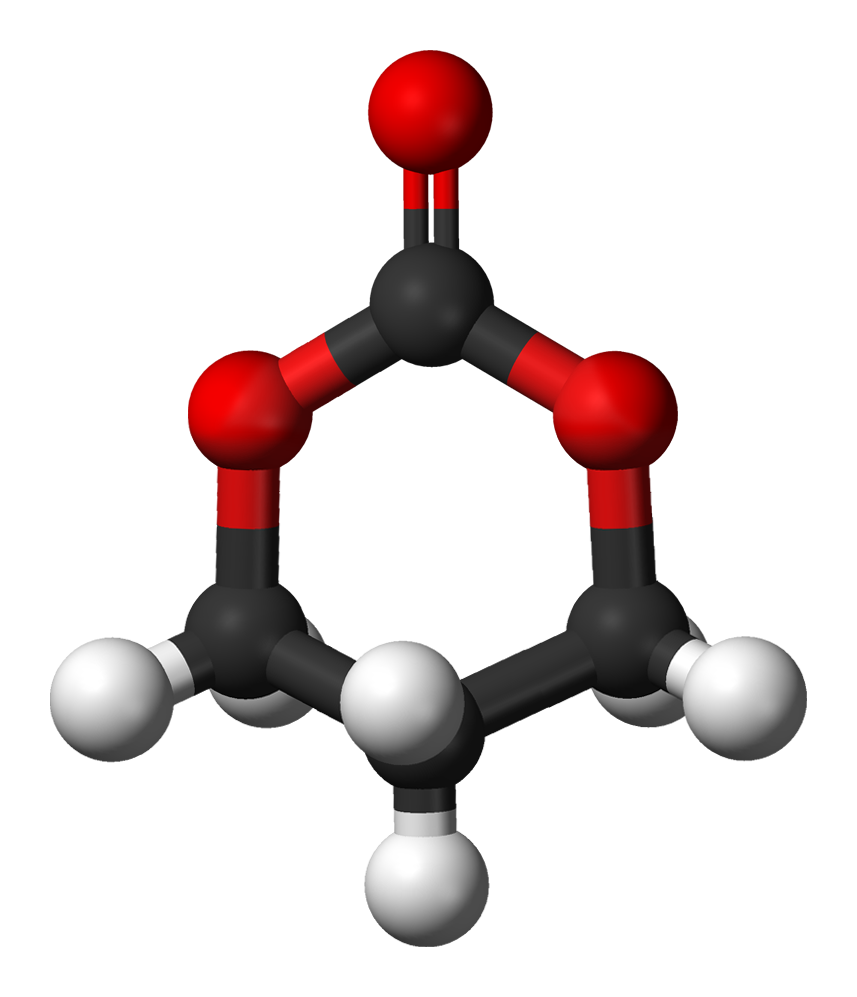

Names
- Preferred IUPAC name 1,3-Dioxan-2-one

Identifiers
CAS Number	2453-03-4
3D model (JSmol)	Interactive image
ChemSpider	110377
ECHA InfoCard	100.114.239
PubChem CID	123834
UNII	4316AQ174Q
CompTox Dashboard (EPA)	DTXSID20953766
- InChI: InChI=1S/C4H6O3/c5-4-6-2-1-3-7-4/h1-3H2 Key: YFHICDDUDORKJB-UHFFFAOYSA-N; InChI=1/C4H6O3/c5-4-6-2-1-3-7-4/h1-3H2 Key: YFHICDDUDORKJB-UHFFFAOYAZ
- SMILES: O=C1OCCCO1

Properties
Chemical formula	C_{4}H_{6}O_{3}
Molar mass	102.089 g·mol^{−1}
Appearance	White solid
- Except where otherwise noted, data are given for materials in their standard state (at 25 °C [77 °F], 100 kPa). Infobox references

Trimethylene carbonate, or 1,3-propylene carbonate, is a 6-membered cyclic carbonate ester. It is a colourless solid that upon heating or catalytic ring-opening converts to poly(trimethylene carbonate) (PTMC). Such polymers are called aliphatic polycarbonates and are of interest for potential biomedical applications. An isomeric derivative is propylene carbonate, a colourless liquid that does not spontaneously polymerize.

== Preparation ==
This compound may be prepared from 1,3-propanediol and ethyl chloroformate (a phosgene substitute), or from oxetane and carbon dioxide with an appropriate catalyst:

HOC_{3}H_{6}OH + ClCO_{2}C_{2}H_{5} → C_{3}H_{6}O_{2}CO + C_{2}H_{5}OH + HCl
C_{3}H_{6}O + CO_{2} → C_{3}H_{6}O_{2}CO

This cyclic carbonate undergoes ring-opening polymerization to give poly(trimethylene carbonate), abbreviated PTMC.

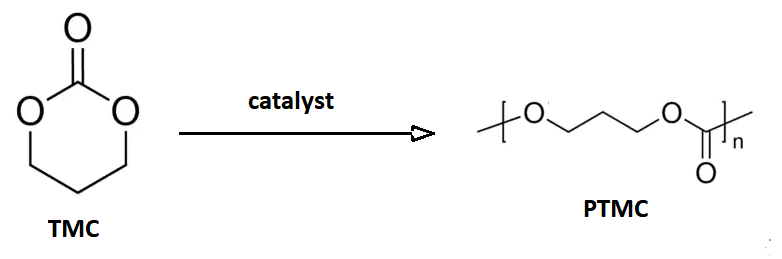

== Medical devices ==
The polymer PTC is of commercial interest as a biodegradable polymer with biomedical applications. A block copolymer of glycolic acid and trimethylene carbonate (TMC) is the material of the Maxon suture, a monofilament resorbable suture which was introduced in the mid-1980s. The same material is used in other resorbable medical devices.

== See also ==
- Ethylene carbonate
