= Carbonate ester =

Chemical group (R–O–C(=O)–O–R′)

Chemical structure of the carbonate ester group

In organic chemistry, a carbonate ester (organic carbonate or organocarbonate) is an ester of carbonic acid. This functional group consists of a carbonyl group flanked by two alkoxy groups. The general structure of these carbonates is R−O−C(=O)−O−R′ and they are related to esters (R−O−C(=O)−R′), ethers (R−O−R′) and also to the inorganic carbonates.

Monomers of polycarbonate (e.g. Makrolon or Lexan) are linked by carbonate groups. These polycarbonates are used in eyeglass lenses, compact discs, and bulletproof glass. Small carbonate esters like dimethyl carbonate, ethylene carbonate, propylene carbonate are used as solvents, dimethyl carbonate is also a mild methylating agent.

== Structures ==
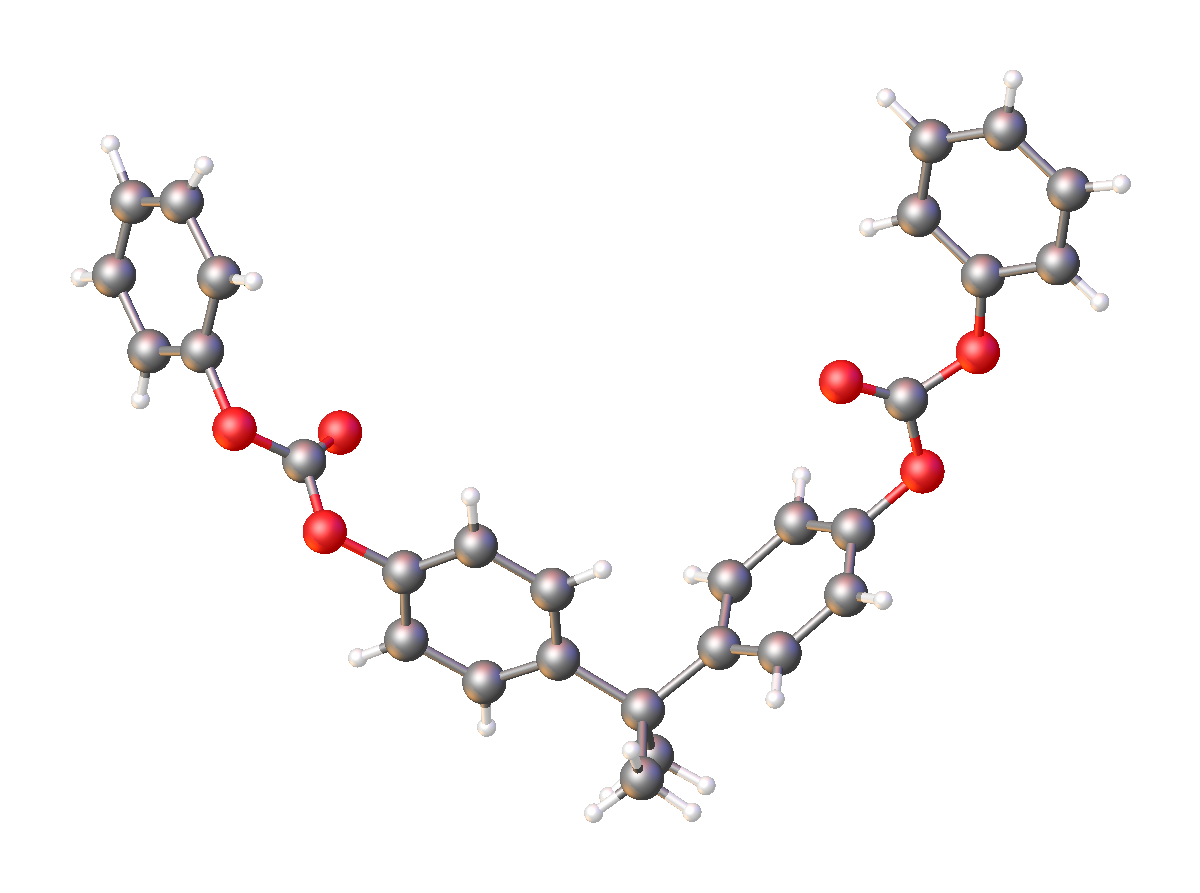
Structure of dicarbonate (PhOC(O)OC_{6}H_{4})_{2}CMe_{2} derived from bis(phenol-A) and two equivalents of phenol.

Carbonate esters have planar OC(OC)_{2} cores, which confers rigidity. The unique O=C bond is short (1.173 Å in the depicted example), while the C–O bonds are more ether-like (the bond distances of 1.326 Å for the example depicted).

Carbonate esters can be divided into three structural classes: acyclic, cyclic, and polymeric. The first and general case is the acyclic carbonate group. Organic substituents can be identical or not. Both aliphatic or aromatic substituents are known, they are called dialkyl or diaryl carbonates, respectively. The simplest members of these classes are dimethyl carbonate and diphenyl carbonate.

Alternatively, the carbonate groups can be linked by a 2- or 3-carbon bridge, forming cyclic compounds such as ethylene carbonate and trimethylene carbonate. The bridging compound can also have substituents, e.g. CH_{3} for propylene carbonate. Instead of terminal alkyl or aryl groups, two carbonate groups can be linked by an aliphatic or aromatic bifunctional group.

A third family of carbonates are the polymers, such as poly(propylene carbonate) and poly(bisphenol A carbonate) (e.g. Makrolon or Lexan).

== Preparation ==
Two main routes to carbonate esters are practiced: the reaction of an alcohol (or phenol) with phosgene (phosgenation), and the reaction of an alcohol with carbon monoxide and an oxidizer (oxidative carbonylation). Other carbonate esters may subsequently be prepared by transesterification.

In principle dimethylcarbonate can be prepared by direct condensation of methanol and carbon dioxide. The reaction is however thermodynamically unfavorable. A selective membrane can be used to separate the water from the reaction mixture and increase the yield.

Diphenyl carbonate, a representative acyclic carbonate ester

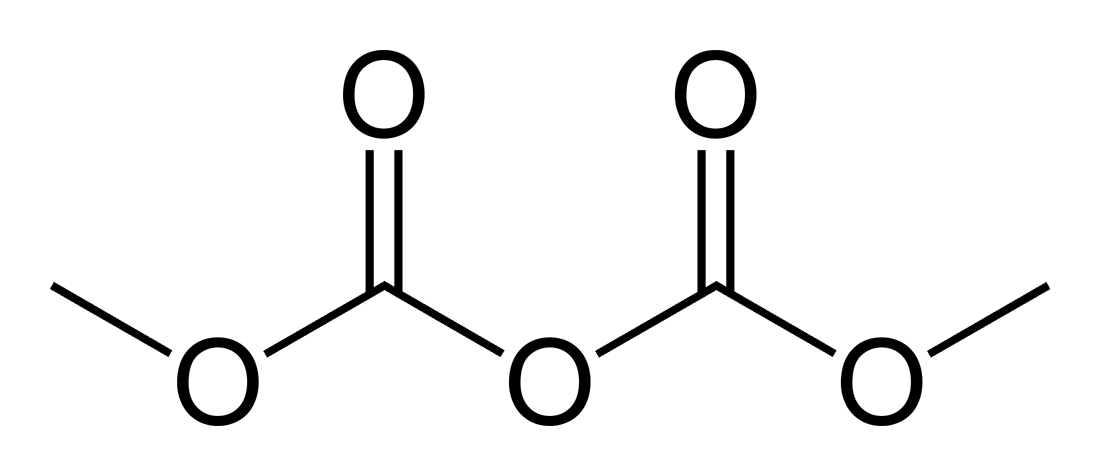
Dimethyl dicarbonate, a preservative

Ethylene carbonate, a cyclic carbonate ester

Trimethylene carbonate, another cyclic carbonate ester

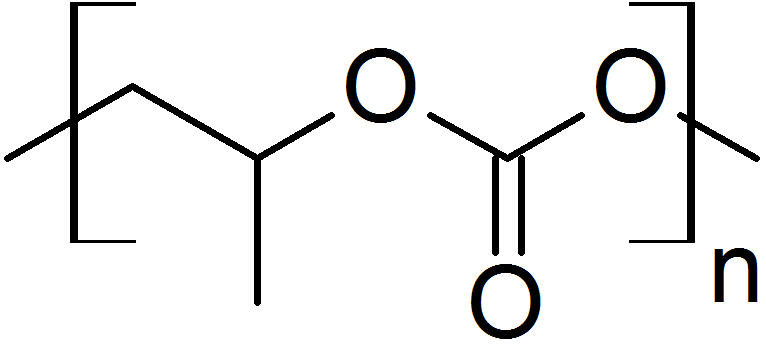
Poly(propylene carbonate)

Poly(bisphenol A carbonate), a commercially important plastic (Lexan)

=== Phosgenation ===
Alcohols react with phosgene to yield carbonate esters according to the following reaction:

2 ROH + COCl_{2} → ROC(O)OR + 2 HCl

Phenols react similarly. Polycarbonate derived from bisphenol A is produced in this manner. This process is high yielding. However, toxic phosgene is used, and stoichiometric quantities of base (e.g. pyridine) are required to neutralize the hydrogen chloride that is cogenerated. Chloroformate esters are intermediates in this process. Rather than reacting with additional alcohol, they may disproportionate to give the desired carbonate diesters and one equivalent of phosgene:

PhOH + COCl_{2} → PhOC(O)Cl + HCl
2 PhOC(O)Cl → PhOC(O)OPh + COCl_{2}

Overall reaction is:

2 PhOH + COCl_{2} → PhOC(O)OPh + 2 HCl

=== Oxidative carbonylation ===
Oxidative carbonylation is an alternative to phosgenation. The advantage is the avoidance of phosgene. Using copper catalysts, dimethylcarbonate is prepared in this way:

2 MeOH + CO + 1/2 O_{2} → MeOC(O)OMe + H_{2}O

Diphenyl carbonate is also prepared similarly, but using palladium catalysts. The Pd-catalyzed process requires a cocatalyst to reconvert the Pd(0) to Pd(II). Manganese(III) acetylacetonate has been used commercially.

=== Reaction of carbon dioxide with epoxides ===
The reaction of carbon dioxide with epoxides is a general route to the preparation of cyclic 5-membered carbonates. Annual production of cyclic carbonates was estimated at 100,000 tonnes per year in 2010. Industrially, ethylene and propylene oxides readily react with carbon dioxide to give ethylene and propylene carbonates (with an appropriate catalyst). For example:

C_{2}H_{4}O + CO_{2} → C_{2}H_{4}O_{2}CO

=== Carbonate transesterification ===
Carbonate esters can be converted to other carbonates by transesterification. A more nucleophilic alcohol will displace a less nucleophilic alcohol. In other words, aliphatic alcohols will displace phenols from aryl carbonates. If the departing alcohol is more volatile, the equilibrium may be driven by distilling that off.

== Reactions ==
Carbonate esters undergo many of the reactions of conventional carboxylic acid esters. With Grignard reagents carbonate esters react to give tertiary alcohols. Some cyclic carbonates are susceptible to polymerization.

Pyrolysis of poly(1,6-hexylenecarbonate) gives 5-hexenal as described by the following idealized equation:

(OC_{6}H_{12}O)CO → 2 CH_{2}=CHCH_{2}CH_{2}CH_{2}CH_{2}OH + CO_{2}

The corresponding decenol is produced from the polycarbonate derived from 1,10-decanediol.

== Uses ==
Organic carbonates are used as solvents in lithium batteries. Due to their high polarity, they dissolve lithium salts. The problem of high viscosity is circumvented by using mixtures for example of dimethyl carbonate, diethyl carbonate, and dimethoxyethane.

They are also used as solvents in organic synthesis. Classified as polar solvents, they have a wide liquid temperature range. One example is propylene carbonate with melting point −55 °C and boiling point 240 °C. Other advantages are low ecotoxicity and good biodegradability. Many industrial production pathways for carbonates are not green because they rely on phosgene or propylene oxide.

Dimethyl dicarbonate is commonly used as a beverage preservative, processing aid, or sterilant.
