= Diethyl pyrocarbonate =

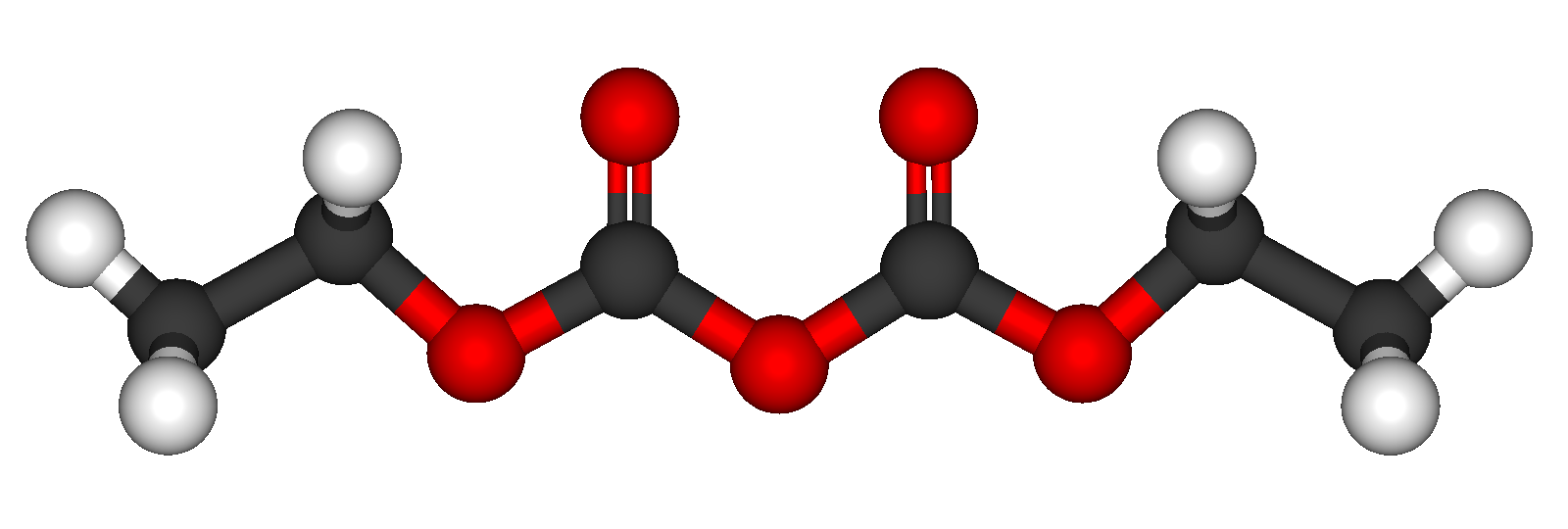

Names
- Preferred IUPAC name Diethyl dicarbonate
- Other names: Diethylpyrocarbonate; Diethyl oxydiformate; Ethoxyformic anhydride; Pyrocarbonic acid diethyl ester; DEPC

Identifiers
CAS Number	1609-47-8
3D model (JSmol)	Interactive image
ChEBI	CHEBI:59051
ChEMBL	ChEMBL55517
ChemSpider	2943
ECHA InfoCard	100.015.039
EC Number	216-542-8
KEGG	C11592
MeSH	Diethylpyrocarbonate
PubChem CID	3051
UNII	LMR3LZG146
CompTox Dashboard (EPA)	DTXSID2051764
- InChI: InChI=1S/C6H10O5/c1-3-9-5(7)11-6(8)10-4-2/h3-4H2,1-2H3 Key: FFYPMLJYZAEMQB-UHFFFAOYSA-N; InChI=1/C6H10O5/c1-3-9-5(7)11-6(8)10-4-2/h3-4H2,1-2H3 Key: FFYPMLJYZAEMQB-UHFFFAOYAU
- SMILES: O=C(OCC)OC(=O)OCC

Properties
Chemical formula	C_{6}H_{10}O_{5}
Molar mass	162.141 g·mol^{−1}
Appearance	Clear, colorless liquid
Density	1.101 g/mL at 25 °C; 1.121 g/mL at 20 °C
Boiling point	93 to 94 °C (199 to 201 °F; 366 to 367 K) at 24 hPa

Hazards
- Occupational safety and health (OHS/OSH)
Main hazards	Harmful
- GHS labelling
Pictograms	(GHS07: Exclamation mark)
Signal word	Warning
Hazard statements	H302, H315, H319, H332, H335
Precautionary statements	P261, P264, P270, P271, P280, P301+P312, P302+P352, P304+P312, P304+P340, P305+P351+P338, P312, P321, P330, P332+P313, P337+P313, P362, P403+P233, P405, P501
Flash point	69 °C (156 °F; 342 K) closed cup
- Lethal dose or concentration (LD, LC)
LD_{50} (median dose)	Oral - rat - 850 mg/kg

Related compounds
Related compounds	Di-tert-butyl dicarbonate; Dimethyl dicarbonate; Diethyl carbonate
- Except where otherwise noted, data are given for materials in their standard state (at 25 °C [77 °F], 100 kPa). verify (what is ?) Infobox references

Diethyl pyrocarbonate (DEPC), also called diethyl dicarbonate (IUPAC name), is used in the laboratory to inactivate RNase enzymes in water and on laboratory utensils. It does so by the covalent modification of histidine (most strongly), lysine, cysteine, and tyrosine residues.

== History ==
Historically, DEPC was called Baycovin. It was used to preserve wines and prevent fermentation, and was banned in the US for food use in 1972, due to a potential carcinogenic effect when combined with urethane. It was confirmed to not be authorised in the EU by 1973.

== Usage ==
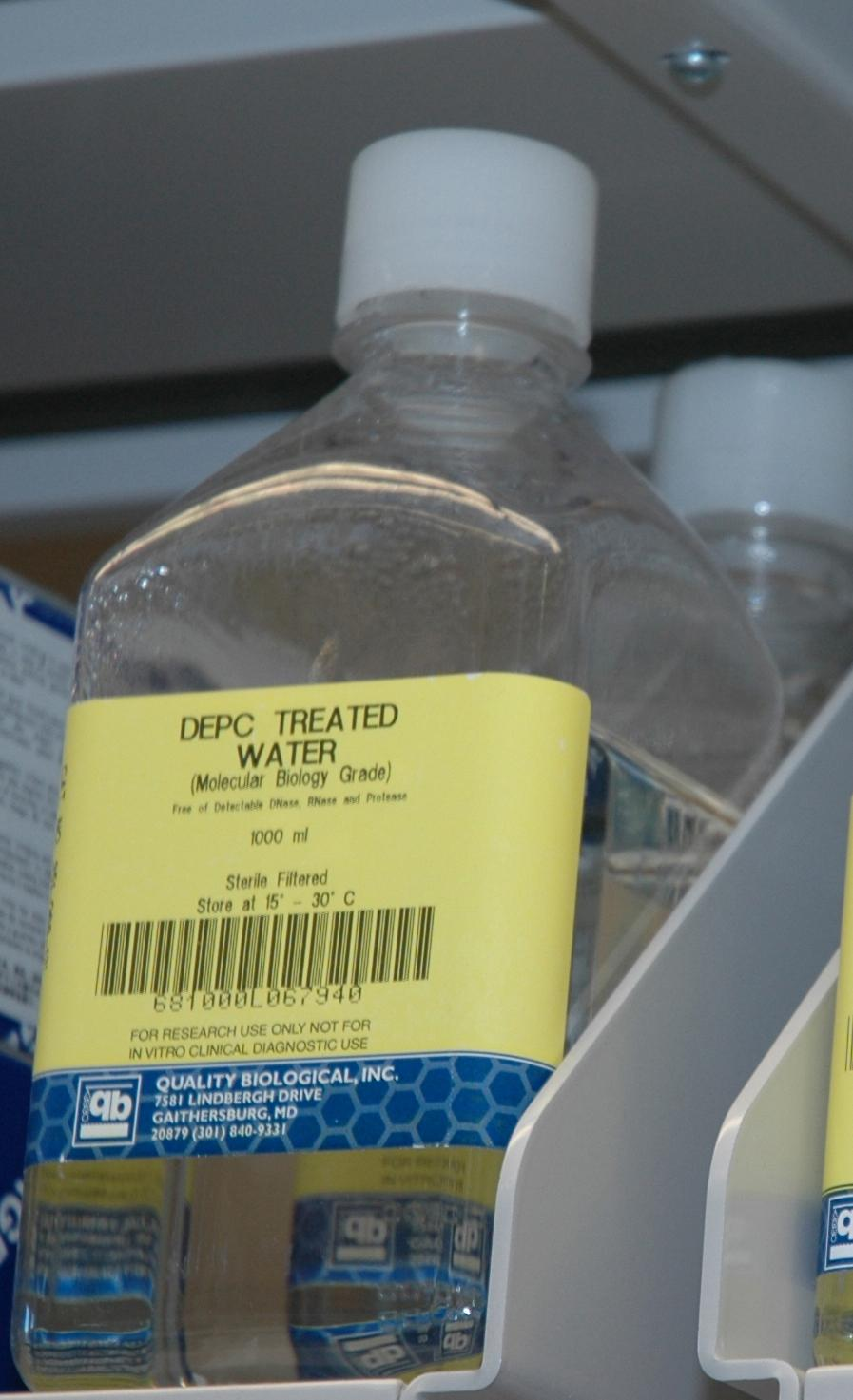
DEPC treated water for use in a laboratory

DEPC-treated (and therefore RNase-free) water is used in handling of RNA in the laboratory to reduce the risk of RNA being degraded by RNases.

Water is usually treated with 0.1% v/v DEPC for at least 2 hours at 37 °C and then autoclaved (at least 15 min) to inactivate traces of DEPC. Inactivation of DEPC in this manner yields CO_{2} and ethanol. Higher concentrations of DEPC are capable of deactivating larger amounts of RNase, but remaining traces or byproducts may inhibit further biochemical reactions such as in vitro transcription. Furthermore, chemical modification of RNA such as carboxymethylation is possible when traces of DEPC or its byproducts are present, resulting in impaired recovery of intact RNA even after buffer exchange (after precipitation).

DEPC is unstable in water and susceptible to hydrolysis to carbon dioxide and ethanol, especially in the presence of a nucleophile. For this reason, DEPC cannot be used with Tris or HEPES buffers. In contrast, it can be used with phosphate-buffered saline or MOPS. A handy rule is that enzymes or chemicals which have active -O:, -N: or -S: cannot be treated with DEPC to become RNase-free, as DEPC reacts with these species. Furthermore, DEPC degradation products can inhibit in vitro transcription.

DEPC derivatization of histidines is also used to study the importance of histidyl residues in enzymes. Modification of histidine by DEPC results in carbethoxylated derivates at the N-omega-2 nitrogen of the imidazole ring. DEPC modification of histidines can be reversed by treatment with 0.5 M hydroxylamine at neutral pH.

DEPC can also be used for probing the structure of double-stranded DNA.
