= 1,2-Diformylhydrazine =

Names
- Preferred IUPAC name N′-Formylformohydrazide
- Other names Diformohydrazide; Diformohydrazine; Bicarbamaldehyde

Identifiers
CAS Number	628-36-4
3D model (JSmol)	Interactive image
ChemSpider	11837
ECHA InfoCard	100.010.037
EC Number	211-040-5
PubChem CID	12342
UNII	RM2E8R3N3L
CompTox Dashboard (EPA)	DTXSID8020468
- InChI: InChI=1S/C2H4N2O2/c5-1-3-4-2-6/h1-2H,(H,3,5)(H,4,6) Key: POVXOWVFLAAVBH-UHFFFAOYSA-N
- SMILES: O=CNNC=O

Properties
Chemical formula	C_{2}H_{4}N_{2}O_{2}
Molar mass	88.066 g·mol^{−1}
Appearance	White solid
Melting point	155–157 °C (311–315 °F; 428–430 K)
- Except where otherwise noted, data are given for materials in their standard state (at 25 °C [77 °F], 100 kPa). Infobox references

1,2-Diformylhydrazine is the chemical compound with the formula N_{2}H_{2}(CHO)_{2}. It is a white, water-soluble solid. A related species is the monoformyl analog, called formic hydrazide (HCON_{2}H_{3}, 624-84-0 ).

As verified by X-ray crystallography, it is a planar molecule with N-N, N-C, and C=O distances of 1.38, 1.33 and 1.24 Å, respectively.
