= Propylene carbonate =

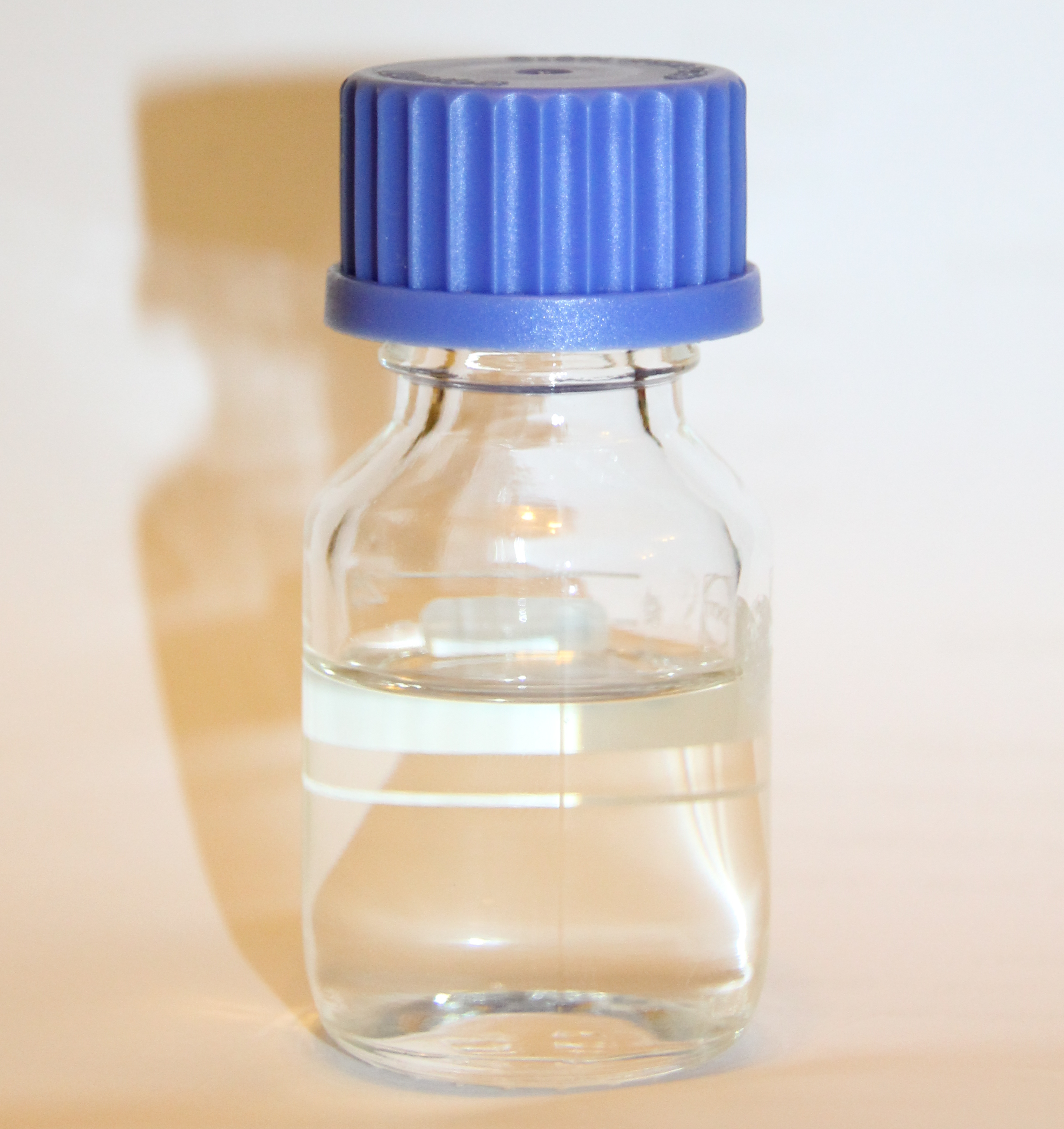

Names
- Preferred IUPAC name 4-Methyl-1,3-dioxolan-2-one
- Other names (RS)-4-Methyl-1,3-dioxolan-2-one; Cyclic propylene carbonate Carbonic acid propylene ester Cyclic 1,2-propylene carbonate Propylene glycol cyclic carbonate 1,2-Propanediol carbonate 4-Methyl-2-oxo-1,3-dioxolane; Arconate 5000; Texacar PC

Identifiers
CAS Number	108-32-7
3D model (JSmol)	Interactive image
ChemSpider	7636
ECHA InfoCard	100.003.248
PubChem CID	7924
UNII	8D08K3S51E
CompTox Dashboard (EPA)	DTXSID2026789
- InChI: InChI=1S/C5H8O6/c1-3(11-5(8)9)2-10-4(6)7/h3H,2H2,1H3,(H,6,7)(H,8,9)/p-1 Key: ZEBXBLIKXVICMJ-UHFFFAOYSA-M; InChI=1/C5H8O6/c1-3(11-5(8)9)2-10-4(6)7/h3H,2H2,1H3,(H,6,7)(H,8,9)/p-1 Key: ZEBXBLIKXVICMJ-REWHXWOFAP
- SMILES: CC1COC(=O)O1

Properties
Chemical formula	C_{4}H_{6}O_{3}
Molar mass	102.089 g·mol^{−1}
Appearance	Colorless liquid
Density	1.205 g/cm^{3}
Melting point	−48.8 °C (−55.8 °F; 224.3 K)
Boiling point	242 °C (468 °F; 515 K)
Solubility in water	Very soluble (240 g/L at 20°C)
Refractive index (n_{D})	1.4189
Viscosity	2.76 mPa·s (20 °C (68 °F; 293 K))

Structure
Dipole moment	4.9 D

Hazards
- Occupational safety and health (OHS/OSH)
Main hazards	Irritant
- GHS labelling
Pictograms	(GHS07: Exclamation mark)
Signal word	Warning
Hazard statements	H319
Precautionary statements	P305+P351+P338
NFPA 704 (fire diamond)	1 1 1
Flash point	132 °C (270 °F; 405 K)
Autoignition temperature	455 °C (851 °F; 728 K)
Safety data sheet (SDS)	MSDS by SMC Global

Related compounds
Related compounds	Ethylene carbonate Dimethyl carbonate
- Except where otherwise noted, data are given for materials in their standard state (at 25 °C [77 °F], 100 kPa). verify (what is ?) Infobox references

Propylene carbonate (often abbreviated PC) is an organic compound with the formula C_{4}H_{6}O_{3}. It is a cyclic carbonate ester derived from propylene glycol. This colorless and odorless liquid is useful as a polar, aprotic solvent. Propylene carbonate is chiral, but is used as the racemic mixture in most contexts.

The name carbonate indicates a carbonate ester, an organic compound containing the carbonate group O=C(−O−)_{2}, not a salt of carbonic acid, (H_{2}CO_{3}), characterized by the presence of the carbonate ion, a polyatomic ion with the formula CO^{2−}_{3}.

== Preparation ==
Although many organic carbonates are produced using phosgene, propylene and ethylene carbonates are exceptions. They are mainly prepared by the carbonation of the epoxides (epoxypropane, or propylene oxide here):

CH_{3}CHCH_{2}O + CO_{2} → CH_{3}C_{2}H_{3}O_{2}CO

The corresponding reaction of 1,2-propanediol with phosgene is complex, yielding not only propylene carbonate but also oligomeric products.

Propylene carbonate can also be synthesized from urea and propylene glycol over zinc acetate.

== Applications ==
=== As a solvent ===
Propylene carbonate is used as a polar, aprotic solvent. It has a high molecular dipole moment (4.9 D), considerably higher than those of acetone (2.91 D) and ethyl acetate (1.78 D). It is possible, for example, to obtain potassium, sodium, and other alkali metals by electrolysis of their chlorides and other salts dissolved in propylene carbonate.

=== Electrolyte ===
Due to its high relative permittivity (dielectric constant) of 64, it is frequently used as a high-permittivity component of electrolytes in lithium batteries, usually together with a low-viscosity solvent (e.g. dimethoxyethane). Its high polarity allows it to create an effective solvation shell around lithium ions, thereby creating a conductive electrolyte. However, it is not used in lithium-ion batteries due to its destructive effect on graphite.

=== Other ===
Propylene carbonate can also be found in some adhesives, paint strippers, and in cosmetics. It is also used as plasticizer. Propylene carbonate is also used as a solvent for removal of CO_{2} from natural gas and synthesis gas where H_{2}S is not also present. This use was developed by El Paso Natural Gas Company and Fluor Corporation in the 1950s for use at the Terrell County Gas Plant in West Texas, now owned by Occidental Petroleum.

Propylene carbonate product may be converted to other carbonate esters by transesterification as well (see Carbonate ester#Carbonate transesterification).

In electrospray ionization mass spectrometry, propylene carbonate is doped into low surface tension solutions to increase analyte charging.

In Grignard reaction propylene carbonate (or most other carbonate esters) might be used to create tertiary alcohols.

== Safety ==
Clinical studies indicate that propylene carbonate does not cause skin irritation or sensitization when used in cosmetic preparations, whereas moderate skin irritation is observed when used undiluted. No significant toxic effects were observed in rats fed propylene carbonate, exposed to the vapor, or exposed to the undiluted liquid. In the US, propylene carbonate is not regulated as a volatile organic compound (VOC) because it does not contribute significantly to the formation of smog and because its vapor is not known or suspected to cause cancer or other toxic effects.

== See also ==
- Ethylene carbonate
- Trimethylene carbonate
