= Poly(trimethylene carbonate) =

Polycarbonate

Names
- IUPAC name poly(trimethylene carbonate), poly(1,3-Dioxan-2-one)
- Other names Poly(TMC), 1,3-Dioxan-2-one homopolymer

Identifiers
CAS Number	31852-84-3

Properties
Chemical formula	(C_{4}H_{6}O_{3})_{n}
Melting point	38 to 41°C
- Except where otherwise noted, data are given for materials in their standard state (at 25 °C [77 °F], 100 kPa). Infobox references

Poly(trimethylene carbonate) (PTMC) is an aliphatic polycarbonate synthesized from the 6-membered cyclic carbonate, trimethylene carbonate (1,3-propylene carbonate or 1,3-Dioxan-2-one). Trimethylene carbonate (TMC) is a colorless crystalline solid with melting point ranging between 45°C and 48 °C and boiling point at 255°C (at 760 mmHg). TMC is originally synthesized from 1,3-propanediol with phosgene or carbon monoxide, which are highly poisonous gases. Another route is from the transesterification of 1,3-propanediol and dialkylcarbonates. This route is considered "greener" compared to the other one, since precursors can be obtained from renewable resources and carbon dioxide.

== Synthesis ==
In opposition to five-membered cyclic carbonate, the six-membered ones like trimethylene carbonate are thermodynamically less stable than its polymer, undergoing the ring-opening polymerization with retention of CO$_2$ in the polymer structure, and generation an aliphatic polycarbonate.

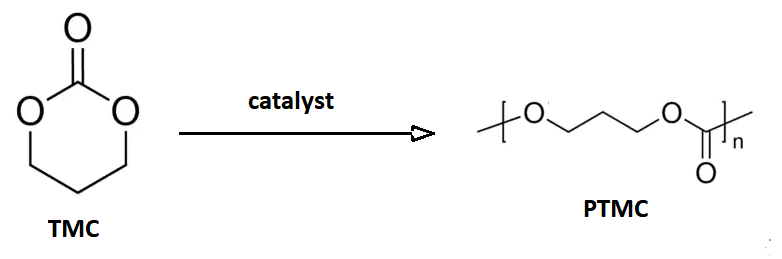
TMC polymerization by catalysts

Ring-opening polymerization (ROP) is the most common method used to synthesize poly(trimethylene carbonate) and their copolymers, since this synthetic route can allow mild reaction condition.

Several ROP catalysts/initiators have been used to synthesize the polymer, among them metal-catalyzed polymerization using oxides, salts and complexes of Al, K, Ti, Zn, Zr, Sn and rare earths metals; enzyme-catalyzed polymerization; and alcohol-initiated polymerization.

== Physical properties ==
PTMC is a predominantly amorphous polymer in the relaxed state but it can present some crystallinity, particularly when the chains are stretched.

The polymer presents glass transition temperature ($T_g$) between -15 and -30 °C and melting temperature ($T_m$) ranging from 38 to 41°C.

Low molecular weight PTMC is a rubbery polymer with poor dimensional stability, tackiness, and inadequate mechanical properties. Nevertheless, high molecular weight amorphous PTMC (over 100,000) is very flexible, with a relatively low elastic modulus (5–7 MPa) at room temperature, tough and it presents excellent ultimate mechanical properties. Mechanical properties of the rubber can be also improved upon cross-linking by gamma-irradiation.

PTMC has resistance to non-enzymatic hydrolysis, compared to most aliphatic polyesters, but it is biodegradable in vivo by enzymes. It is a resorbable material since the ester bonds can be enzymatically broken, producing CO$_2$ and water. So, in vivo, it degrades by surface erosion and its decomposition products contain no organic acids, preventing potential inflammatory responses.

== Applications ==
Due to the predominant amorphous nature, PTMC is a flexible polymer with rubbery behavior. In addition, the biodegradability and biocompatibility of PTMC make it to have high applicability in biomedical applications as scaffolds for tissue regeneration and drug delivery devices.

PTMC has been used as scaffolds for tissue engineering particularly for some types of soft tissues in which the maintenance of mechanical properties is important for tissue reconstruction. PTMC-based membranes have been also evaluated as barrier for use in hard tissue guided regeneration like bone. The performance of these membranes is comparable with commercial collagen and e-PTFE membranes, showing well suitability for use in guided bone regeneration.

Due to rubbery and hydrophobic nature, PTMC-based copolymers produced from ROP of TMC with lactone-based comonomers have been synthesized to modify these characteristics, amplifying applications. Thus, the use as resorbable medical devices in which control of rigidity and biodegradation time are desired has been proposed. Main examples of these copolymers are poly(L-lactide-co-trimethylene carbonate), poly(glycolide-co-trimethylene carbonate) and poly(caprolactone-co-trimethylene carbonate).

Poly(L-lactide-co-trimethylene carbonate) has been proposed for application as small diameter vascular grafts. Poly(glycolide-co-trimethylene carbonate) is a commercial monofilament used for suture with slow biodegradation rate which allows maintenance of high mechanical strength compatible with the surgical recovery. Poly(caprolactone-co-trimethylene carbonate) has been proposed as biomaterial for conduits in the regeneration of central nervous system.
