= Succinyl chloride =

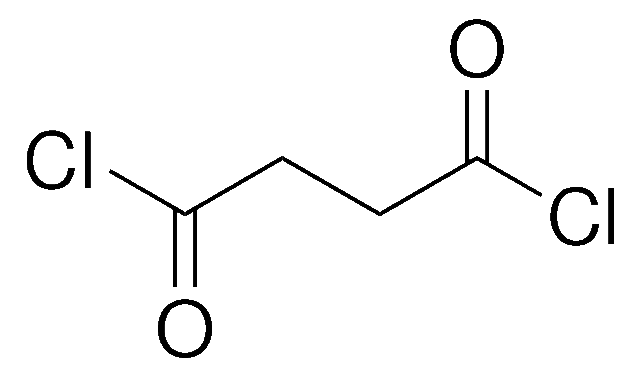

Names
- Preferred IUPAC name Butanedioyl dichloride
- Other names Succinic acid dichloride, succinoyl dichloride

Identifiers
CAS Number	543-20-4
3D model (JSmol)	Interactive image
ChemSpider	13867055
ECHA InfoCard	100.008.035
EC Number	208-838-0
PubChem CID	10970
UNII	GDN09V9867
CompTox Dashboard (EPA)	DTXSID6060260
- InChI: InChI=1S/C4H4Cl2O2/c5-3(7)1-2-4(6)8/h1-2H2 Key: IRXBNHGNHKNOJI-UHFFFAOYSA-N
- SMILES: ClC(=O)CCC(Cl)=O

Properties
Chemical formula	C_{4}H_{4}Cl_{2}O_{2}
Molar mass	154.97 g·mol^{−1}
Appearance	colorless liquid
Density	1.41 g·ml−1
Melting point	15–18 °C (59–64 °F; 288–291 K)
Boiling point	190 °C (374 °F; 463 K)
Solubility in water	Reacts violently with water

Hazards
- GHS labelling
Pictograms	(GHS05: Corrosive)
Signal word	Danger
Hazard statements	H227, H314
Precautionary statements	P280, P303+P361+P353, P305+P351+P338, P310, P405
Flash point	76 °C (169 °F; 349 K)
- Except where otherwise noted, data are given for materials in their standard state (at 25 °C [77 °F], 100 kPa). Infobox references

Succinyl chloride is the organic compound with the formula (CH_{2})_{2}(COCl)_{2}. It is the acyl chloride derivative of succinic acid and a simple diacid chloride. It is a colorless liquid. It used as a reagent in organic synthesis.
