= Polypropylene carbonate =

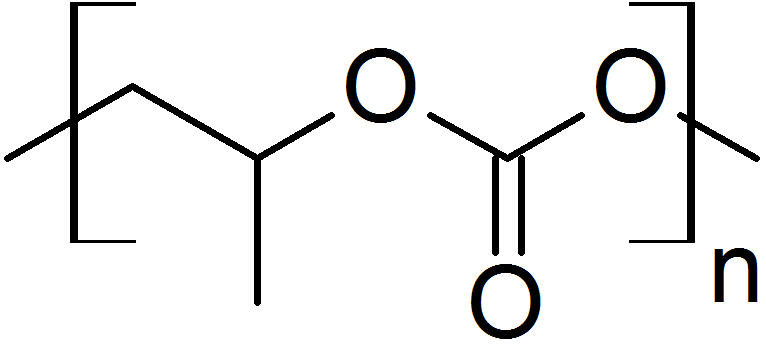

Names
- Other names Poly(propylene carbonate)

Identifiers
CAS Number	50862-75-4
3D model (JSmol)	Interactive image
ChemSpider	none
- SMILES: *CCCOC(=O)O*

Properties
Chemical formula	[CH(CH_{3})CH_{2}OCO_{2}]_{n}
- Except where otherwise noted, data are given for materials in their standard state (at 25 °C [77 °F], 100 kPa). Infobox references

Polypropylene carbonate (PPC), a copolymer of carbon dioxide and propylene oxide, is a thermoplastic material. Catalysts like zinc glutarate are used in polymerization.

== Properties ==
Polypropylene carbonate is soluble in polar solvents like lower ketones, ethyl acetate, dichloromethane and chlorinated hydrocarbons and insoluble in solvents like alcohols, water, and aliphatic hydrocarbons. It also forms stable emulsions in water. PPC allows the diffusion of gases like oxygen through it. Having a glass temperature (T_{g}) between 25 and 45 °C, PPC binders are amorphous. The glass temperature of PPC is slightly greater than polyethylene carbonate (PEC).

Its refractive index is 1.46 while its dielectric constant is 3.

== Applications ==
Polypropylene carbonate is used to increase the toughness of some epoxy resins. It is used as a sacrificial binder in the ceramic industry, which decomposes and evaporates during sintering. It has a low sodium content which makes it suitable for the preparation of electroceramics like dielectric materials and piezoelectric ceramics.

Composites of polypropylene carbonate with starch (PPC/starch) are used as biodegradable plastics.

One of the largest manufacturers of polypropylene carbonate is Empower Materials, located in New Castle, DE, USA.
