= Oxamide =

Oxamide
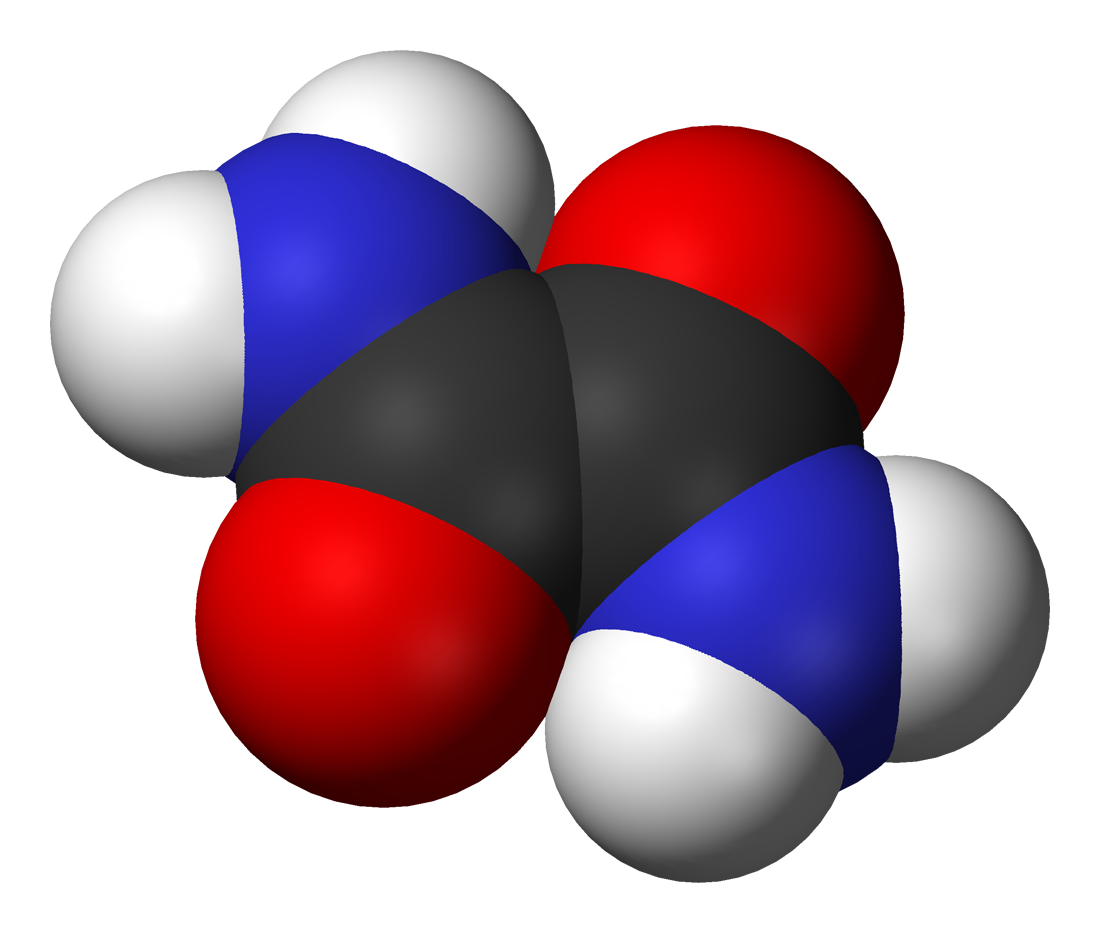
Oxamide

Names
- Preferred IUPAC name Oxamide
- Systematic IUPAC name Ethanediamide
- Other names: Oxalamide; Oxamimidic acid; Diaminoglyoxal; Oxalic acid diamide; 1-Carbamoyl-formimidic acid

Identifiers
CAS Number	471-46-5
3D model (JSmol)	Interactive image
ChEBI	CHEBI:48248
ChemSpider	9709
ECHA InfoCard	100.006.767
EC Number	207-442-5
PubChem CID	10113
UNII	SBE4M0223E
CompTox Dashboard (EPA)	DTXSID1060051
- InChI: InChI=1S/C2H4N2O2/c3-1(5)2(4)6/h(H2,3,5)(H2,4,6) Key: YIKSCQDJHCMVMK-UHFFFAOYSA-N; InChI=1/C2H4N2O2/c3-1(5)2(4)6/h(H2,3,5)(H2,4,6) Key: YIKSCQDJHCMVMK-UHFFFAOYAL
- SMILES: NC(=O)C(N)=O

Properties
Chemical formula	(CONH_{2})_{2}
Molar mass	88.0654 g/mol
Appearance	White powder
Density	1.667 g/cm^{3}
Melting point	122 °C (252 °F; 395 K)
Boiling point	324 °C (615 °F; 597 K) , decomposes above 350 °C
Solubility in water	Slightly soluble
Solubility	Soluble in ethanol, insoluble in diethyl ether
Magnetic susceptibility (χ)	−39.0·10^{−6} cm^{3}/mol

Hazards
Flash point	> 300 °C (572 °F; 573 K)
- Except where otherwise noted, data are given for materials in their standard state (at 25 °C [77 °F], 100 kPa). verify (what is ?) Infobox references

Oxamide is the organic compound with the formula (CONH_{2})_{2}. This white crystalline solid is soluble in ethanol, slightly soluble in water and insoluble in diethyl ether. Oxamide is the diamide derived from oxalic acid, and the hydrate of cyanogen.

== Preparation ==
Oxamide is produced from hydrogen cyanide, which is oxidized to cyanogen, which is then hydrolyzed.

It can also be prepared from formamide by glow-discharge electrolysis.

It can also be prepared from ammonium oxalate via pyrolysis.

== Application ==
The main application is as a substitute for urea in fertilizers. Oxamide hydrolyzes (releases ammonia) very slowly, which is sometimes preferred vs the quick release by urea.

It is used as a stabilizer for nitrocellulose preparations. It also finds use in APCP rocket motors as a high performance burn rate suppressant. The use of oxamide in concentrations of 1-3 wt% has shown to slow the linear burn rate while having minimal impact on propellant specific impulse.

N,N'-substituted oxamides are supporting ligands for the copper-catalyzed amination and amidation of aryl halides in Ullmann-Goldberg reaction, including relatively unreactive aryl chloride substrates.

== Reactions ==
It dehydrates above 350 °C releasing cyanogen. Oxamide derivatives form self-assembled monolayers consisting of a hydrogen bonded network.
