= Diethyl carbonate =

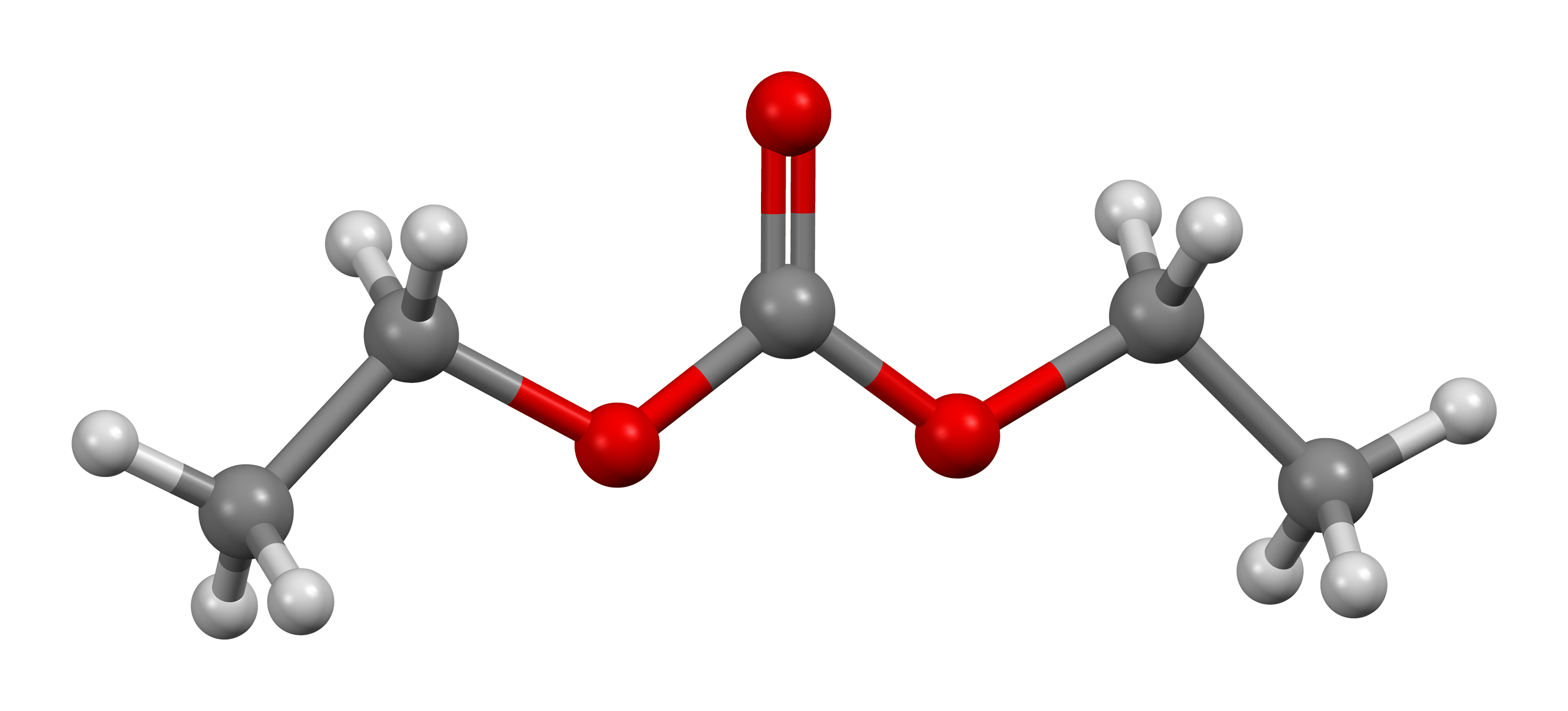

Names
- Preferred IUPAC name Diethyl carbonate
- Other names: Carbonic ether; Eufin

Identifiers
CAS Number	105-58-8
3D model (JSmol)	Interactive image
Abbreviations	DEC; Et_{2}CO_{3}
ChEMBL	ChEMBL1533495
ChemSpider	7478
ECHA InfoCard	100.003.011
EC Number	203-311-1
PubChem CID	7766
RTECS number	FF9800000
UNII	3UA92692HG
UN number	2366
CompTox Dashboard (EPA)	DTXSID3025041
- InChI: InChI=1S/C5H10O3/c1-3-7-5(6)8-4-2/h3-4H2,1-2H3 Key: OIFBSDVPJOWBCH-UHFFFAOYSA-N
- SMILES: O=C(OCC)OCC

Properties
Chemical formula	C_{5}H_{10}O_{3}
Molar mass	118.132 g·mol^{−1}
Appearance	Colorless liquid
Density	0.975 g/cm^{3}
Melting point	−74.3 °C (−101.7 °F; 198.8 K)
Boiling point	125.9 °C (258.6 °F; 399.0 K)
Solubility in water	Insoluble

Hazards
- GHS labelling
Pictograms	(GHS02: Flammable) (GHS07: Exclamation mark)
Signal word	Warning
Hazard statements	H226, H315, H319, H335
Precautionary statements	P210, P233, P240, P241, P242, P243, P261, P264, P271, P280, P302+P352, P303+P361+P353, P304+P340, P305+P351+P338, P312, P321, P332+P313, P337+P313, P362, P370+P378, P403+P233, P403+P235, P405, P501
Flash point	33 °C (91 °F; 306 K)

Related compounds
Related compounds	Ethylene carbonate; Diethyl pyrocarbonate; Dimethyl carbonate
- Except where otherwise noted, data are given for materials in their standard state (at 25 °C [77 °F], 100 kPa). verify (what is ?) Infobox references

Diethyl carbonate (sometimes abbreviated DEC) is an ester of carbonic acid and ethanol with the formula OC(OCH_{2}CH_{3})_{2}. At room temperature (25 °C) diethyl carbonate is a colorless liquid with a low flash point.

== Production ==
It can be made by combining phosgene and ethanol, i.e. a phosgenation reaction:

2 CH_{3}CH_{2}OH +COCl_{2} → (CH_{3}CH_{2}O)_{2}CO + 2 HCl

Although usually impractical, DEC can also be made by ethanolysis of urea. This reaction requires a heterogeneous catalysis that can act both as a Lewis acid and a base, such as various metal oxides. The reaction proceeds via the formation of the intermediary ethyl carbamate.

2 CH_{3}CH_{2}OH +CO(NH_{2})_{2} → (CH_{3}CH_{2}O)_{2}CO + 2 NH_{3}

It can also be synthesized directly from carbon dioxide and ethanol using various methods, and via oxidative carbonylation with carbon monoxide. Another method is transesterification from dimethyl carbonate. Yet another method is from the reaction of ethyl nitrite and carbon monoxide, where the ethyl nitrite can be made from nitric oxide and ethanol. This method requires a catalyst such as palladium.

== Uses ==
Diethyl carbonate is mainly used as an industrial solvent.

It is also used as a vehicle for erythromycin intramuscular injections. It can be used as a component of electrolytes in lithium batteries. It has been proposed as a fuel additive to support cleaner diesel fuel combustion because its high boiling point might reduce blended fuels' volatility, minimizing vapor buildup in warm weather that can block fuel lines. As a fuel additive, it can reduce emissions such as volatile organic compounds, CO_{2}, and particulates.

0.01% v/v DEC solutions can be used as a relatively gentle cold sterilizing reagent for laboratory chromatography resins.
