= Glycerol-1,2-carbonate =

Organic chemical compound

Names
- Other names: 4-Hydroxymethyl-1,3-dioxolan-2-one; 4-Hydroxymethyl-2-oxo-1,3-dioxolan; Glycerol carbonate; Hydroxypropylene carbonate

Identifiers
CAS Number	931-40-8
3D model (JSmol)	Interactive image
ChemSpider	88417
ECHA InfoCard	100.012.032
EC Number	213-235-0
PubChem CID	97944
UNII	C15K4UUJ1E
CompTox Dashboard (EPA)	DTXSID90862477
- InChI: InChI=1S/C4H6O4/c5-1-3-2-7-4(6)8-3/h3,5H,1-2H2 Key: JFMGYULNQJPJCY-UHFFFAOYSA-N
- SMILES: C1C(OC(=O)O1)CO

Properties
Chemical formula	C_{4}H_{6}O_{4}
Molar mass	118.088 g·mol^{−1}
Appearance	clear, colourless to light yellow liquid
Density	1.40 g·cm^{−3} at 25 °C 1.41 g·cm^{−3} at 20 °C
Melting point	−60 °C at 1013 hPa −69 °C
Boiling point	110–115 °C at 0.1 mmHg 137–140 °C at 0.7 hPa; 160 °C at 0.11 kPa; 239 °C at 102.1 kPa
Solubility in water	Miscible
Solubility	Miscible in polar solvents such as alcohols Miscible with tetrahydrofuran
Vapor pressure	0.93 Pa at 25 °C
Refractive index (n_{D})	1,4570 – 1,4610 (20 °C) 1,469 (20 °C)

Hazards
NFPA 704 (fire diamond)	2 1 0
- Except where otherwise noted, data are given for materials in their standard state (at 25 °C [77 °F], 100 kPa). Infobox references

Glycerol-1,2-carbonate is formally the cyclic ester of carbonic acid with glycerol and has aroused great interest as a possible product from the "waste materials" carbon dioxide CO_{2} and glycerol (especially from biodiesel production) with a wide range of applications.

The currently unsatisfactory yields and complex process conditions in direct synthesis stand in the way of a further spread of glycerol carbonate as a solvent and molecular building block from renewable raw materials.

== Manufacture ==
A large number of synthetic routes have been described for the production of glycerol-1,2-carbonate, many of which do not meet the criteria for modern chemical processes in terms of economy, environmental compatibility and safety.

Synthesis of glycerol-1,2-carbonate

Non-glycerol-based syntheses, especially if they are based on expensive precursors such as glycidol or 3-chloro-1,2-propanediol or epichlorohydrin and expensive catalysts make no contribution to the economic solution of the huge glycerol oversupply (estimate for 2024: approx. 6.3 million tons global production volume).

Of the indirect glycerol-based syntheses, in which the cyclic carbonic acid ester glycerol carbonate is produced by inserting a carbonyl group, reactions with particularly inexpensive urea and with dialkyl carbonates such as dimethyl carbonate DMC and ethylene carbonate have been particularly studied.

glycerol-1,2-carbonate from Urea, Dimethyl carbonate and Ethylene carbonate

The transesterification produces methanol or, in the case of urea, ammonia as a by-product, which can be easily removed from the reaction and have little disruption to the work-up.

Recently, a glycerol carbonate synthesis with urea under microwave irradiation with anhydrous zinc sulfate as a heterogeneous catalyst was described. Under optimized conditions (150 °C, 100 min reaction time), glycerol carbonate could be obtained in 93.7% yield.

Most frequently, transesterifications of dialkyl carbonates, predominantly of dimethyl carbonate, with acidic and especially basic catalysts under homogeneous and heterogeneous catalysis have been investigated. Practically quantitative yields of glycerol 1,2-carbonate are sometimes achieved in this way. In homogeneous catalysis, however, it is often difficult to separate mixtures, while the solid bases used in heterogeneous catalysis are often quickly exhausted and only costly, e.g. B. by calcination at temperatures of 300 °C, are recyclable. In addition, with high DMC excesses and long reaction times, by-products such as the so-called diglyceryl tricarbonate (A) and glycerol dicarbonate (B) are formed as a result of the reaction of DMC with the free hydroxyl group of the glycerol carbonate.

Reaktion products of von Glycerol with Dimethyl carbonate

The enzymatically catalyzed conversion of glycerol with DMC in polar solvents has also been described.

Recently, continuous processes have also been published. Quite high space-time yields could be achieved at moderate temperatures (140 °C) and short residence times (<10 min). The efficient direct synthesis of glycerol-1,2-carbonate from glycerol and inert CO_{2} remains a major challenge.

Direct synthesis ofn glycerol-1,2-carbonate

Reports of yields of up to 35% in the reaction in methanol with dibutyltin oxide as a catalyst at 80 °C could not be confirmed.

The results actually achieved are a maximum of 17% when using acetonitrile, which reacts in the basic (potassium carbonate) with the water formed to form acetamide. The reaction conditions required on a 5 millimolar scale (80 bar CO_{2} pressure, 155 °C reaction temperature, 16 h reaction time) are not yet suitable for an economical industrial synthesis. When CO_{2} is passed through to strip the water of reaction, a maximum yield of 13% is achieved under optimized conditions.

The direct carbonylation of glycerol with CO_{2} over highly active cerium(IV) oxide CeO_{2} catalysts in the presence of the water-binding reagent 2-cyanopyridine and the solvent dimethylformamide DMF at 150 °C, 40 MPa CO_{2} pressure and 5 h reaction time gives in 10 millimolar batches "... the incredibly high yield of glycerol carbonate..." of up to 78.9%, with the cerium oxide catalyst being regenerated after 5 cycles by calcining at 400 °C.

== Characteristics ==
Glycerol-1,2-carbonate is a clear colourless viscous liquid with a mild odour, which is completely soluble in water and in polar organic solvents such as e.g. B. alcohols mixes. The compound is in the form of a racemate and can be separated into the enantiomers enzymatically with lipase. The polymers cellulose acetate, nitrocellulose, polyamides and polyacrylonitrile are soluble in glycerol carbonate. The compound is non-flammable, non-toxic and easily biodegradable, it has a low evaporation rate and high moisture retention capacity.

== Applications ==
Potentially large-volume applications of glycerol-1,2-carbonate would be of enormous interest as the glycerol flood can probably only be managed through caloric utilization and the suitability of glycerol carbonate for the chemical fixation of large amounts of CO_{2}.

At high temperatures, glycerol carbonate decomposes almost exclusively into carbon dioxide and 3-hydroxypropanal HOCH_{2}CH_{2}CHO, a reactive aldehyde with great potential as a fuel additive to reduce soot formation in internal combustion engines.

Glycerol-1,2-carbonate can be used in particular in cosmetics and personal care products as a protic solvent with a high Permittivity ε = 82.7 and humectant.

Because of its similarity to propylene carbonate and because of its non-flammability and high dielectric constants, which allow much higher lithium ion concentrations, hydroxypropylene carbonate is being investigated as an electrolyte in lithium-ion batteries. However, protic solvents with reactive free hydroxy groups are undesirable in battery systems.

The epoxy alcohol glycidol is formed in the decarboxylation of glycerol-1,2-carbonate at temperatures > 175 °C, reduced pressure and in the presence of acidic or basic (e.g. potassium oxide ) catalysts in yields of 75 to 85%

Synthesis of Glycidol from glycerol-1,2-carbonate

Inexpensive glycidol as a precursor to polyglycerols, glycerol esters, and glycidyl ethers could find wider application in detergents, paints and coatings, and stabilizers for natural oils and for vinyl polymers.

Epichlorohydrin, which is important for the production of epoxy resins and adhesives, can be obtained from glycerol carbonate via 2-chloromethyl-1,3-dioxolane-2-one and its decarboxylation at 80 °C in yields of up to 90%.

Synthesis of Epichlorhydrin from glycerol-1,2-carbonate

Polyglycerol esters are formed by the reaction of long-chain carboxylic acids with glycerol carbonate (and other cyclic carbonates such as ethylene carbonate) in the presence of strong bases and can i.a. as emulsifiers, dispersants, flow improvers and lubricants.

Synthesis of Polyglycerol esters

Biodegradable, water-soluble and non-flammable polycarbonate homopolymers are formed when glycerol-1,2-carbonate is heated to 140 °C in the presence of zinc sulfate,

Synthesis from Polyglycerincarbonates

and with excess glycerin, copolymers which might find application as lubricants, detergents, drilling aids, and so forth.

Of particular interest could be the use of bis-glycerol carbonates in non-isocyanate-based polyurethanes (NIPUs), which could replace problematic diisocyanates such as toluene-2,4-diisocyanate TDI and methylene diphenyl diisocyanate MDI.

Non isocyanate based polyurethanes (NIPUs) from glycerol-1,2-carbonate

Even a partial substitution of diisocyanates in polyurethanes by bis-glycerol carbonates would be a significant outlet for glycerol derivatives and a milestone in the use of monomers from renewable raw materials.

== See also ==
- Glycerol
- Dioxalin
- Epichlorohydrin
- Nitroglycerin
- Oleochemicals
- Saponification/Soapmaking
- Solketal
- Transesterification
