= Polytrimethylene terephthalate =

Names
- Other names Poly(trimethylene terephthalate); Poly(oxy-1,3-propanediyloxycarbonyl-1,4-phenylenecarbonyl)

Identifiers
CAS Number	26590-75-0
ChemSpider	none
CompTox Dashboard (EPA)	DTXSID9094296

Properties
Chemical formula	(C_{11}H_{10}O_{4})_{n}
- Except where otherwise noted, data are given for materials in their standard state (at 25 °C [77 °F], 100 kPa). Infobox references

Polytrimethylene terephthalate (PTT), is a polyester synthesized and patented in 1941. It is produced by a method called condensation polymerization or transesterification. The two monomer units used in producing this polymer are: 1,3-propanediol and terephthalic acid or dimethyl terephthalate. Similar to polyethylene terephthalate, the PTT is used to make carpet fibers.

PTT's value as a commercial polymer has improved due to more economical and efficient methods to produce 1,3-propanediol in the 1980s by Degussa, via acrolein, and Shell via the hydroformylation of ethylene oxide. DuPont has successfully commercialized the production of this polymer via 1,3-propanediol obtained by fermentation. These developments may allow PTT to effectively compete against PBT and PET, two polyesters that have been far more successful than PTT to date.

== Production ==
Similar to the ubiquitous poly(ethylene terephthalate), this polymer is prepared by the esterification of 1,3-propanediol (HO(CH_{2})_{3}OH) with terephthalic acid (C_{6}H_{4}(COOH)_{2}), or by transesterification of dimethyl terephthalate:

Reaction scheme of PTT-synthesis …
… by esterification.
… by transesterification.

This polymer has been commercialized as Sorona by DuPont.

== Applications ==
On Friday, March 20, 2009, the Federal Trade Commission approved a subclass to polyester called triexta. The PTT fiber used in Mohawk's SmartStrand carpet, and branded Sorona by Dupont can be labeled triexta. Triexta has been reported to have several advantages over polyethylene terephthalate, including better stain resistance and softness.

The FTC had last approved an extension for residential carpet in 1959. Mohawk Industries and DuPont applied jointly for FTC approval of the triexta polyester subclass in 2006; it was approved three years later.
