= Dimethyl oxalate =

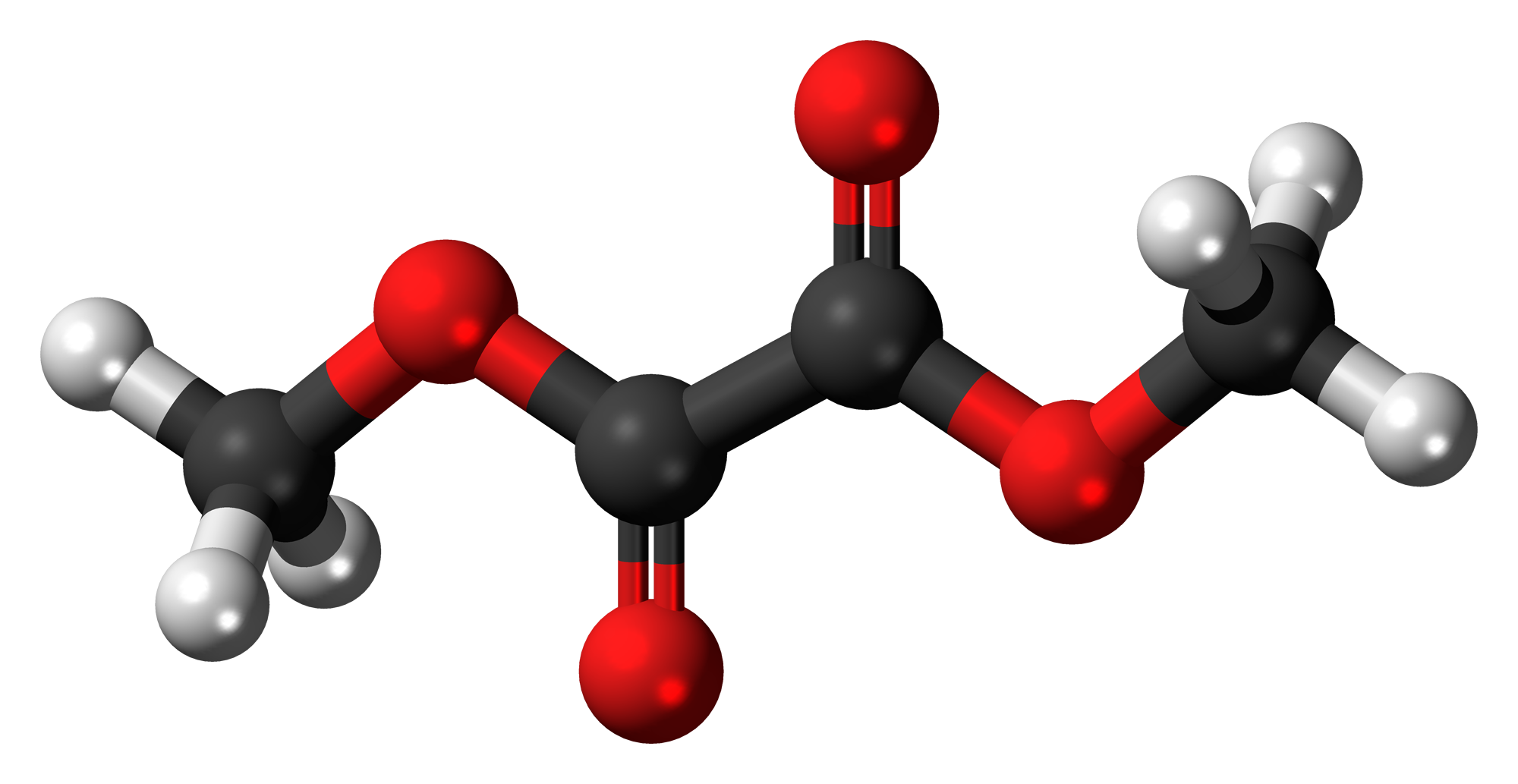

Names
- Preferred IUPAC name Dimethyl oxalate

Identifiers
CAS Number	553-90-2
3D model (JSmol)	Interactive image
ChemSpider	10649
ECHA InfoCard	100.008.231
PubChem CID	11120
UNII	IQ3Q79344S
CompTox Dashboard (EPA)	DTXSID9060287
- InChI: InChI=1S/C4H6O4/c1-7-3(5)4(6)8-2/h1-2H3 Key: LOMVENUNSWAXEN-UHFFFAOYSA-N; InChI=1/C4H6O4/c1-7-3(5)4(6)8-2/h1-2H3 Key: LOMVENUNSWAXEN-UHFFFAOYAF
- SMILES: O=C(OC)C(=O)OC

Properties
Chemical formula	C_{4}H_{6}O_{4}
Molar mass	118.088 g·mol^{−1}
Appearance	White crystals
Melting point	53 to 55 °C (127 to 131 °F; 326 to 328 K)
Boiling point	166 to 167 °C (331 to 333 °F; 439 to 440 K)
Magnetic susceptibility (χ)	−55.7·10^{−6} cm^{3}/mol

Related compounds
Related compounds	Diethyl oxalate, Diphenyl oxalate
- Except where otherwise noted, data are given for materials in their standard state (at 25 °C [77 °F], 100 kPa). Infobox references

Dimethyl oxalate is an organic compound with the formula (CO_{2}CH_{3})_{2} or (CH_{3})_{2}C_{2}O_{4}. It is the dimethyl ester of oxalic acid. Dimethyl oxalate is a colorless or white solid that is soluble in water.

== Production ==
Dimethyl oxalate can be obtained by esterification of oxalic acid with methanol using sulfuric acid as a catalyst:

$$\rm 2\ CH_3OH + (CO_2H)_2\ \xrightarrow{H_2SO_4}\ (CO_2CH_3)_2 + 2\ H_2O$$

=== Oxidative carbonylation route ===
The preparation by oxidative carbonylation has attracted interest because it requires only C1 precursors:

$$\rm 4 \ CH_3OH + 4 \ CO + O_2 \xrightarrow{catalyst}\ 2 \ (CO_2CH_3)_2 + 2 \ H_2O$$

The reaction is catalyzed by Pd^{2+}. The synthesis gas is mostly obtained from coal or biomass. The oxidation proceeds via dinitrogen trioxide, which is formed according to (1) of nitrogen monoxide and oxygen and then reacts according to (2) with methanol forming methyl nitrite:

In the next step of dicarbonylation (3) carbon monoxide reacts with methyl nitrite to dimethyl oxalate in the vapor phase at atmospheric pressure and temperatures at 80-120 °C over a palladium catalyst:

The sum equation:

This method is lossless with respect to methyl nitrite, which acts practically as a carrier of oxidation equivalents. However, the water formed must be removed to prevent hydrolysis of the dimethyl oxalate product. With 1% Pd/α-Al_{2}O_{3} dimethyl oxalate is produced selectively in a dicarbonylation reaction, under the same conditions with 2% Pd/C dimethyl carbonate is produced by monocarbonylation:

Alternatively, the oxidative carbonylation of methanol can be carried out with high yield and selectivity with 1,4-benzoquinone as an oxidant in the system Pd(OAc)_{2}/PPh_{3}/benzoquinone with mass ratio 1/3/100 at 65 °C and 70 atm CO:

== Reactions ==
Dimethyl oxalate (and the related diethyl ester) is used in diverse condensation reactions. For example, diethyl oxalate condenses with cyclohexanone to give the diketo-ester, a precursor to pimelic acid. With diamines, the diesters of oxalic acid condense to give cyclic diamides. Quinoxalinedione is produced by condensation of dimethyloxalate and o-phenylenediamine:

C_{2}O_{2}(OMe)_{2} + C_{6}H_{4}(NH_{2})_{2} → C_{6}H_{4}(NHCO)_{2} + 2 MeOH

Hydrogenation gives ethylene glycol. Dimethyl oxalate can be converted into ethylene glycol in high yields (94.7%)

The methanol formed is recycled in the process of oxidative carbonylation. Other plants with a total annual capacity of more than 1 million tons of ethylene glycol per year are planned.

Decarbonylation gives dimethyl carbonate.

Diphenyl oxalate is obtained by transesterification with phenol in the presence of titanium catalysts, which is again decarbonylated to diphenyl carbonate in the liquid or gas phase.

Dimethyl oxalate can also be used as a methylating agent. It is notably less toxic than other methylating agents such as methyl iodide or dimethyl sulfate.

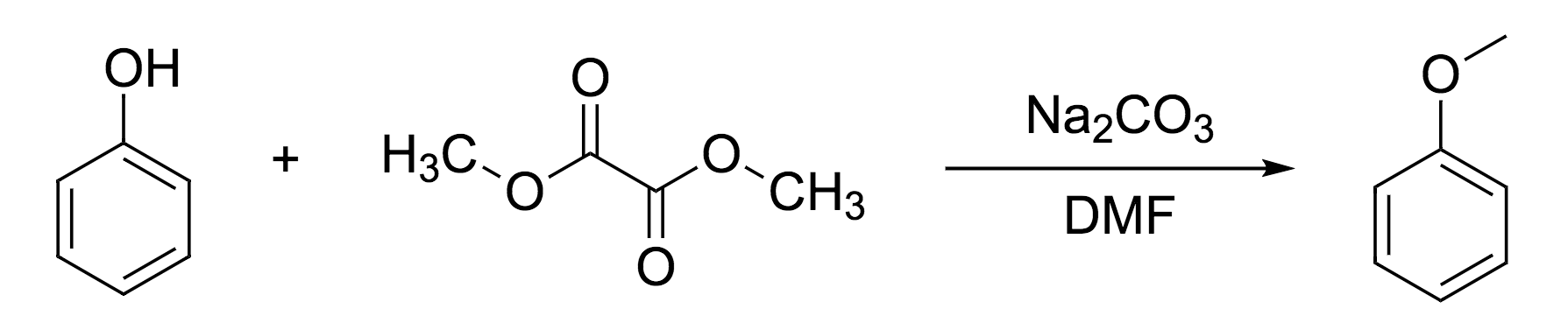
