= C4H6O4 =

The molecular formula C_{4}H_{6}O_{4} (molar mass: 118.09 g/mol) may refer to:

- Diacetyl peroxide
- Dimethyl oxalate
- Glycerol-1,2-carbonate
- Methylmalonic acid (MMA)
- Succinic acid
