= Oxidative carbonylation =

Oxidative carbonylation is a class of reactions that use carbon monoxide in combination with an oxidant to generate esters and carbonate esters. These transformations utilize transition metal complexes as homogeneous catalysts. Many of these reactions employ palladium catalysts. Mechanistically, these reactions resemble the Wacker process.

== Illustrative oxidative carbonylations ==
Oxidative carbonylation, using palladium-based catalysts, allows certain alkenes to be converted into homologated esters:

2 RCH=CH_{2} + 2 CO + O_{2} + 2 MeOH → 2 RCH=CHCO_{2}Me + 2 H_{2}O

Such reactions are assumed to proceed by the insertion of the alkene into the Pd(II)-CO_{2}Me bond of a metallacarboxylic ester followed by beta-hydride elimination (Me = CH_{3}).

Arylboronic acids react with Pd(II) compounds to give Pd(II)-aryl species, which undergo carbonylation to give Pd(II)-C(O)aryl. These benzyl-Pd intermediates are intercepted by alkenes, which insert. Subsequent beta-hydride elimination gives the arylketone.

The conversion of methanol to dimethylcarbonate by oxidative carbonylation is economically competitive with phosgenation. This reaction is practiced commercially using Cu(I) catalysts:

2 CO + O_{2} + 4 MeOH → 2 (MeO)_{2}CO + 2 H_{2}O

The preparation of dimethyl oxalate by oxidative carbonylation has also attracted commercial interest. It requires only C1 precursors:

4 CO + O_{2} + 4 MeOH → 2 (MeO_{2}C)_{2} + 2 H_{2}O
