= Dibutyltin oxide =

Identifiers
CAS Number	818-08-6
3D model (JSmol)	Interactive image
ChemSpider	55164
ECHA InfoCard	100.011.317
EC Number	212-449-1
PubChem CID	61221
RTECS number	WH7175000
UNII	T435H74FO0
UN number	3146
CompTox Dashboard (EPA)	DTXSID4027315
- InChI: InChI=1S/2C4H9.O.Sn/c2*1-3-4-2;;/h2*1,3-4H2,2H3;; Key: JGFBRKRYDCGYKD-UHFFFAOYSA-N; InChI=1/2C4H9.O.Sn/c2*1-3-4-2;;/h2*1,3-4H2,2H3;;/rC8H18OSn/c1-3-5-7-10(9)8-6-4-2/h3-8H2,1-2H3 Key: JGFBRKRYDCGYKD-KVGUGNSWAI
- SMILES: CCCC[Sn](=O)CCCC

Properties
Chemical formula	C_{8}H_{18}OSn
Molar mass	248.92
Appearance	white solid
Density	1.6 g/cm^{3}
Melting point	> 300 °C (572 °F; 573 K) (decomposes 210 °C)

Hazards
- GHS labelling
Pictograms	(GHS05: Corrosive) (GHS06: Toxic) (GHS07: Exclamation mark) (GHS08: Health hazard) (GHS09: Environmental hazard)
Signal word	Danger
Hazard statements	H301, H302, H315, H317, H318, H341, H360, H370, H372, H373, H410, H411
Precautionary statements	P201, P202, P260, P264, P270, P272, P273, P280, P281, P301+P310, P301+P312, P302+P352, P305+P351+P338, P307+P311, P308+P313, P310, P314, P321, P330, P332+P313, P333+P313, P362, P363, P391, P405, P501
Autoignition temperature	279 °C (534 °F; 552 K)
- Except where otherwise noted, data are given for materials in their standard state (at 25 °C [77 °F], 100 kPa). verify (what is ?) Infobox references

Dibutyltin oxide, or dibutyloxotin, is an organotin compound with the chemical formula (C_{4}H_{9})_{2}SnO. It is a colorless solid that, when pure, is insoluble in organic solvents. It is used as a reagent and a catalyst.

== Structure ==
The structure of diorganotin oxides depends on the size of the organic groups. For smaller substituents, the materials are assumed to be polymeric with five-coordinate Sn centers and 3-coordinate oxide centers. The result is a net of interconnected four-membered Sn_{2}O_{2} and eight-membered Sn_{4}O_{4} rings. The presence of pentacoordinate Sn centers is deduced from ^{119}Sn NMR spectroscopy and ^{119}Sn Mössbauer spectroscopy.

== Uses ==
In organic synthesis, among its many applications, it is particularly useful in directing regioselective O-alkylation, acylation, and sulfonation reactions for diols and polyol. DBTO has been used in the regioselective tosylation (a specific type of sulfonation) of certain polyols to selectively tosylate primary alcohols and exocyclic alcohols over more sterically-hindered alcohols. It also finds use as a transesterification catalyst.

Dibutyltin compounds, such as dibutyltin dilaurate are widely used curing catalysts for the production of silicones and polyurethanes.

== See also ==
Otera's catalyst
