= Cai Qirui =

Chinese chemist (1914–2016)

- 蔡启瑞
- Born: 7 January 1914; Xiang'an District, Xiamen, Fujian, China
- Died: 3 October 2016 (aged 102); Xiamen, Fujian, China
- Education: Xiamen University; Ohio State University
- Known for: Founder of Chinese catalytic chemistry
- Scientific career
- Fields: Catalytic chemistry

Cai Qirui (simplified Chinese: 蔡启瑞; traditional Chinese: 蔡啟瑞; pinyin: Cài Qǐruì; Pe̍h-ōe-jī: Chhoà Khé-suī; 7 January 1914 – 3 October 2016) was a Chinese chemist, educator and academician of the Chinese Academy of Sciences (CAS). He was known as the founder of Chinese catalytic chemistry.

== Biography ==
Cai graduated from Xiamen University in 1937, majoring in chemistry. He later became a teaching assistant at Xiamen University. He moved to Ohio State University by government study abroad scholarship in 1947 and earned his doctoral degree in 1950. He was forbidden to leave the United States after the start of the Korean War. The travel ban on Cai was lifted in 1955 as the result of a swap for 11 U.S. airmen held captive by China since the end of the Korean War. He then returned to Xiamen University in April 1956. He studied catalytic chemistry instead of structural chemistry for Chinese national needs.

Cai played an important role in coordination complex catalysis theory, nitrogen fixation into ammonia and C-1 chemistry which made him the founder of Chinese catalytic chemistry. He won China's State Natural Science Award three times and was elected an academician of the Chinese Academy of Sciences in 1980.

Cai died on 3 October 2016 at the age of 102 in Xiamen.
