= Diethyl oxalate =

Names
- Other names ethyl oxalate

Identifiers
CAS Number	95-92-1
3D model (JSmol)	Interactive image
ChEMBL	ChEMBL3183226
ChemSpider	6998
ECHA InfoCard	100.002.241
EC Number	202-464-1
PubChem CID	7268
UNII	860M3ZWF6J
UN number	2525
CompTox Dashboard (EPA)	DTXSID2044472
- InChI: InChI=1S/C6H10O4/c1-3-9-5(7)6(8)10-4-2/h3-4H2,1-2H3 Key: WYACBZDAHNBPPB-UHFFFAOYSA-N
- SMILES: CCOC(=O)C(=O)OCC

Properties
Chemical formula	C_{6}H_{10}O_{4}
Molar mass	146.142 g·mol^{−1}
Appearance	colorless liquid
Density	1.0785 g/cm^{3}
Melting point	−38.5 °C (−37.3 °F; 234.7 K)
Boiling point	186 °C (367 °F; 459 K)

Hazards
- GHS labelling
Pictograms	(GHS07: Exclamation mark)
Signal word	Warning
Hazard statements	H302, H319
Precautionary statements	P264, P264+P265, P270, P280, P301+P317, P305+P351+P338, P330, P337+P317, P501
- Except where otherwise noted, data are given for materials in their standard state (at 25 °C [77 °F], 100 kPa). Infobox references

Diethyl oxalate is an organic compound with the formula (CO_{2}CH_{2}CH_{3})_{2}. It is the diethyl ester of oxalic acid. Diethyl oxalate is a colorless liquid. It is very similar to dimethyl oxalate but is a liquid at room temperature and has lower solubility in water. Both compounds are reagents in the synthesis of more complex compounds.

== Production ==
Diethyl oxalate can be obtained by esterification of oxalic acid with ethanol using sulfuric acid as a catalyst. A procedure for the closely related dimethyl oxalate is available:

2 CH_{3}CH_{2}OH + (CO_{2}H)_{2} → (CO_{2}CH_{2}CH_{3})_{2} + 2 H_{2}O

== Reactions ==
Diethyl oxalate participates in many condensation reactions, usually to produce esters.

Diethyl oxalate is often used to prepare heterocycles. It is for example a precursor to 3,4-ethylenedioxythiophene. With urea, it condenses to give parabanic acid.
