= Glycerine phthalate =

Glycerol phthalate was the first synthetic polyester. It came into use around World War I. It was used for waterproofing. This polyester does not form linear chains, but is built as a three-dimensional structure.
