= Sorona =

Chemical brand name

Sorona is a partially bio-based polymer brand offered by Covation Biomaterials, composed of polytrimethylene terephthalate (PTT) based fibers and originally commercialized by DuPont in 2000. The fibers are soft and stain-resistant while exhibiting high strength and stiffness.

Sorona is a co-polymer of 1,3-propanediol (obtained by fermentation) and petroleum-derived terephthalic acid (TPA) or dimethyl terephthalate (DMT). Related polymers in this series include polyethylene terephthalate (2GT) and polybutylene terephthalate (polytetramethylene terephthalate) (4GT).

Sorona can theoretically be produced from about 37% renewable resources as DuPont won a 2003 Presidential Green Chemistry Challenge Award for their development of the fermentation process for the production of 1,3-propanediol from corn-derived glucose in recombinant Escherichia coli K-12.

The polymer Sorona has been mentioned by J. Craig Venter in interviews as an example of an application of industrial biotechnology. He was quoted as saying, "DuPont argues that Sorona is going to be the first billion-dollar biotech product other than a pharmaceutical".

== Uses and applications ==
Sorona has been used in the manufacture of clothing, residential carpets, automotive fabrics, and plastic parts. Mohawk Industries is currently the exclusive North American carpet manufacturer making carpets using DuPont Sorona fiber.
