= Transamidification =

Process used in organic chemistry

In organic chemistry, transamidification is the process of exchanging the subunits of a peptide, amide or ester compound with another amine or fatty acid to produce a new amide or peptide. The process has been used for the production of emulsifiers and dispersing agents and oil drilling fluids.

== See also ==
- Transalkylation
- Transesterification
