= 2-Hydroxyethyl methyl terephthalate =

Names
- Other names: 1,4-Benzenedicarboxylic acid, 2-hydroxyethyl methyl ester; mono(methyl terephthalate)ethylene glycol; terephthalic acid, 2-hydroxyethyl methyl ester; 1-(2-hydroxyethyl) 4-methyl benzene-1,4-dicarboxylate; methyl 2-hydroxyethyl terephthalate; monoglycol monomethyl terephthalate; β-Hydroxyethyl methyl terephthalate

Identifiers
CAS Number	3645-00-9
3D model (JSmol)	Interactive image
ChemSpider	69636
EC Number	222-877-0
PubChem CID	77207
UNII	QR42U3BY92
CompTox Dashboard (EPA)	DTXSID9063112
- InChI: InChI=1S/C11H12O5/c1-15-10(13)8-2-4-9(5-3-8)11(14)16-7-6-12/h2-5,12H,6-7H2,1H3 Key: DJQMYWWZWUOCBQ-UHFFFAOYSA-N
- SMILES: COC(=O)C1=CC=C(C=C1)C(=O)OCCO

Properties
Chemical formula	C_{11}H_{12}O_{5}
Molar mass	224.212 g·mol^{−1}
Appearance	white solid
Melting point	71 °C (160 °F; 344 K)
- Except where otherwise noted, data are given for materials in their standard state (at 25 °C [77 °F], 100 kPa). Infobox references

2-Hydroxyethyl methyl terephthalate is an organic compound with the formula HOCH_{2}CH_{2}O_{2}CC_{6}H_{4}CO_{2}CH_{3}. It is a mixed ester of terephthalic acid. This compound is an intermediate in the industrial production of polyethylene terephthalate (>80 Mtons/y) by the transesterification from dimethylterephthalate:

CH_{3}O_{2}CC_{6}H_{4}CO_{2}CH_{3} + HOCH_{2}CH_{2}OH → HOCH_{2}CH_{2}O_{2}CC_{6}H_{4}CO_{2}CH_{3} + CH_{3}OH
n HOCH_{2}CH_{2}O_{2}CC_{6}H_{4}CO_{2}CH_{3} → (OCH_{2}CH_{2}O_{2}CC_{6}H_{4}CO)_{n} + n CH_{3}OH

The compound is also formed by the reverse of the above reaction, the methanolysis of PET.
