= Dimethyl terephthalate =

- Structural formula of dimethyl terephthalate

Names
- Preferred IUPAC name Dimethyl benzene-1,4-dicarboxylate
- Other names: Dimethyl terephthalate; 1,4-Benzenedicarboxylic acid dimethyl ester; Dimethyl 4-phthalate; Dimethyl p-phthalate; Di-Me terephthalate; Methyl 4-carbomethoxybenzoate; Methyl-p-(methoxycarbonyl)benzoate; Methyl terephthalate, di-; Terephthalic acid dimethyl ester (2:1)

Identifiers
CAS Number	120-61-6
3D model (JSmol)	Interactive image; Interactive image
Abbreviations	DMT
Beilstein Reference	1107185
ChEBI	CHEBI:156286
ChemSpider	13863300
ECHA InfoCard	100.004.011
EC Number	204-411-8
MeSH	Dimethyl+4-phthalate
PubChem CID	8441; 12241382 (^{2}H_{4})
RTECS number	WZ1225000
UNII	IKZ2470UNV
CompTox Dashboard (EPA)	DTXSID0020498
- InChI: InChI=1S/C10H10O4/c1-13-9(11)7-3-5-8(6-4-7)10(12)14-2/h3-6H,1-2H3 Key: WOZVHXUHUFLZGK-UHFFFAOYSA-N; InChI=1/C10H10O4/c1-13-9(11)7-3-5-8(6-4-7)10(12)14-2/h3-6H,1-2H3 Key: WOZVHXUHUFLZGK-UHFFFAOYSA-N
- SMILES: COC(=O)C1=CC=C(C=C1)C(=O)OC; O=C(OC)c1ccc(cc1)C(=O)OC

Properties
Chemical formula	C_{10}H_{10}O_{4}
Molar mass	194.186 g·mol^{−1}
Appearance	white solid
Density	1.2 g/cm^{3}
Melting point	142 °C (288 °F; 415 K)
Boiling point	288 °C (550 °F; 561 K)
Acidity (pK_{a})	−7.21
Basicity (pK_{b})	−6.60
- Except where otherwise noted, data are given for materials in their standard state (at 25 °C [77 °F], 100 kPa). verify (what is ?) Infobox references

Dimethyl terephthalate (DMT) is an organic compound with the formula C_{6}H_{4}(COOCH_{3})_{2}. It is the diester formed from terephthalic acid and methanol. It is a white solid that melts to give a distillable colourless liquid. it is an intermediate in some schemes for the recycling of PET, e.g. from plastic bottles.

== Production ==
Dimethyl terephthalate (DMT) can be prepared via a direct esterification of terephthalic acid with methanol:

C_{8}H_{6}O_{4} + 2 CH_{3}OH → C_{10}H_{10}O_{4} + 2 H_{2}O

On a commercial scale, this reaction is usually done at 250–300 °C (482–572 °F) using o-xylene as a solvent. The dimethyl terephthalate that is formed is then purified by distillation. Even terephthalic acid of low purity may be used in this method.

Alternatively, it can be prepared from para-xylene by alternating oxidation and methyl-esterification steps via methyl para-toluate (PT).

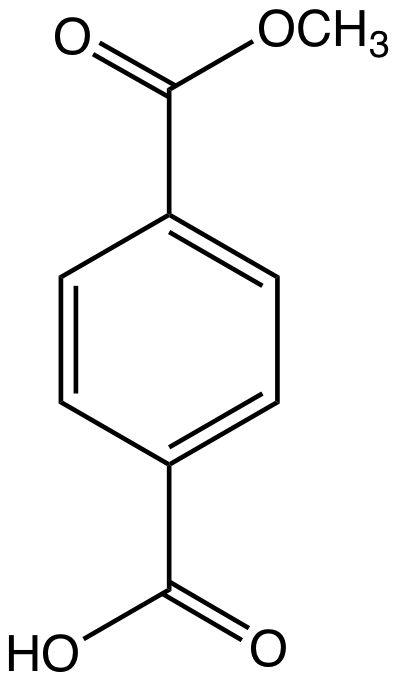
Structure of monomethyl terephthalate

== Uses ==
DMT is used in the production of polyesters, including polyethylene terephthalate (PET), polytrimethylene terephthalate (PTT), and polybutylene terephthalate (PBT). These polymers are produced by transesterification with a diol. In the production of PET, the transesterification initially produces 2-hydroxyethyl methyl terephthalate.

Hydrogenation of DMT affords the diol cyclohexanedimethanol, which is a useful monomer.

== Hazards ==
DMT is not directly dangerous to humans, but it is harmful to aquatic organisms, so environmental releases are avoided. It is flammable and the dust may form explosive mixtures with air.
