= Dimethyl carbonate =

- Dimethyl carbonate

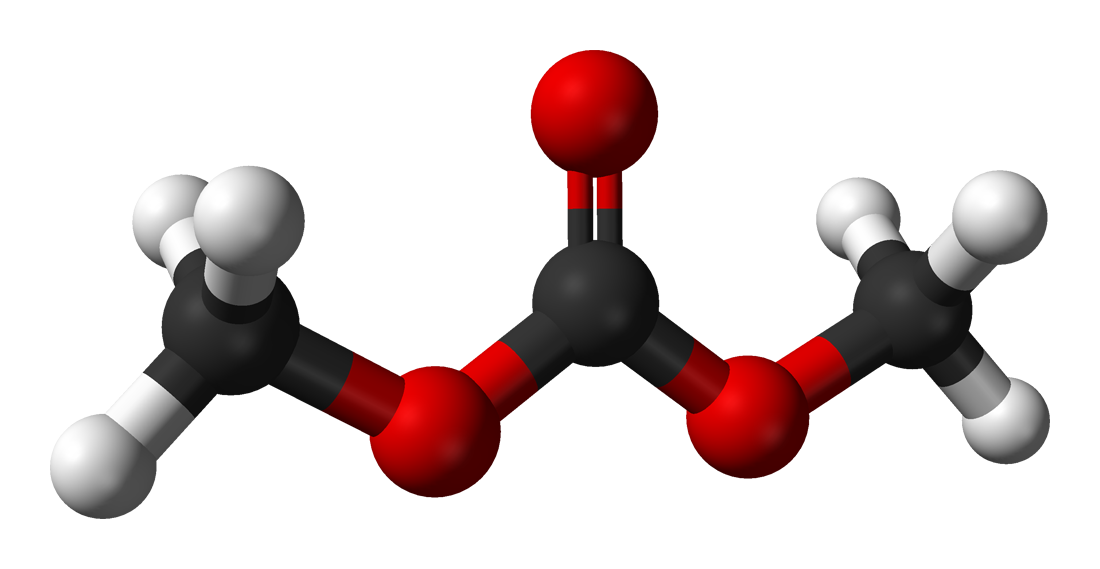
- Ball-and-stick model of dimethyl carbonate

Names
- Preferred IUPAC name Dimethyl carbonate
- Other names Methyl carbonate, di-

Identifiers
CAS Number	616-38-6
3D model (JSmol)	Interactive image
Abbreviations	DMC; Me_{2}CO_{3}
ChEBI	CHEBI:36596
ChemSpider	11526
ECHA InfoCard	100.009.527
PubChem CID	12021
UNII	KE9J097SPN
CompTox Dashboard (EPA)	DTXSID9029192
- InChI: InChI=1S/C3H6O3/c1-5-3(4)6-2/h1-2H3 Key: IEJIGPNLZYLLBP-UHFFFAOYSA-N; InChI=1/C3H6O3/c1-5-3(4)6-2/h1-2H3 Key: IEJIGPNLZYLLBP-UHFFFAOYAC
- SMILES: COC(=O)OC

Properties
Chemical formula	C_{3}H_{6}O_{3}
Molar mass	90.078 g·mol^{−1}
Appearance	colorless liquid
Density	1.069-1.073 g/mL
Melting point	2 to 4 °C (36 to 39 °F; 275 to 277 K)
Boiling point	90 °C (194 °F; 363 K)
Critical point (T, P)	548 K, 4.5×10^{6} Pa
Solubility in water	13.9 g/100 mL
Solubility	miscible with alcohol and ether
Vapor pressure	55.36 mmHg

Hazards
- Occupational safety and health (OHS/OSH)
Main hazards	Flammable
- GHS labelling
Pictograms	(GHS02: Flammable)
Signal word	Danger
Hazard statements	H225
Precautionary statements	P210, P233, P240, P241, P242, P243, P280, P303+P361+P353, P370+P378, P403+P235, P501
NFPA 704 (fire diamond)	1 3 1
Flash point	17 °C (63 °F; 290 K)
Autoignition temperature	458 °C (856 °F; 731 K)
Explosive limits	vol% in air: 4.2-12.9
- Lethal dose or concentration (LD, LC)
LD_{50} (median dose)	800 mg/kg (mouse, intraperitoneal)

Related compounds
Related compounds	Diethyl carbonate; Dimethyl dicarbonate
- Except where otherwise noted, data are given for materials in their standard state (at 25 °C [77 °F], 100 kPa). verify (what is ?) Infobox references

Dimethyl carbonate (DMC) is an organic compound with the formula OC(OCH_{3})_{2}. It is a colourless, flammable liquid. It is classified as a carbonate ester. This compound has found use as a methylating agent and as a co-solvent in lithium-ion batteries. Notably, dimethyl carbonate is a weak methylating agent, and is not considered as a carcinogen. Instead, dimethyl carbonate is often considered to be a green reagent, and it is exempt from the restrictions placed on most volatile organic compounds (VOCs) in the United States.

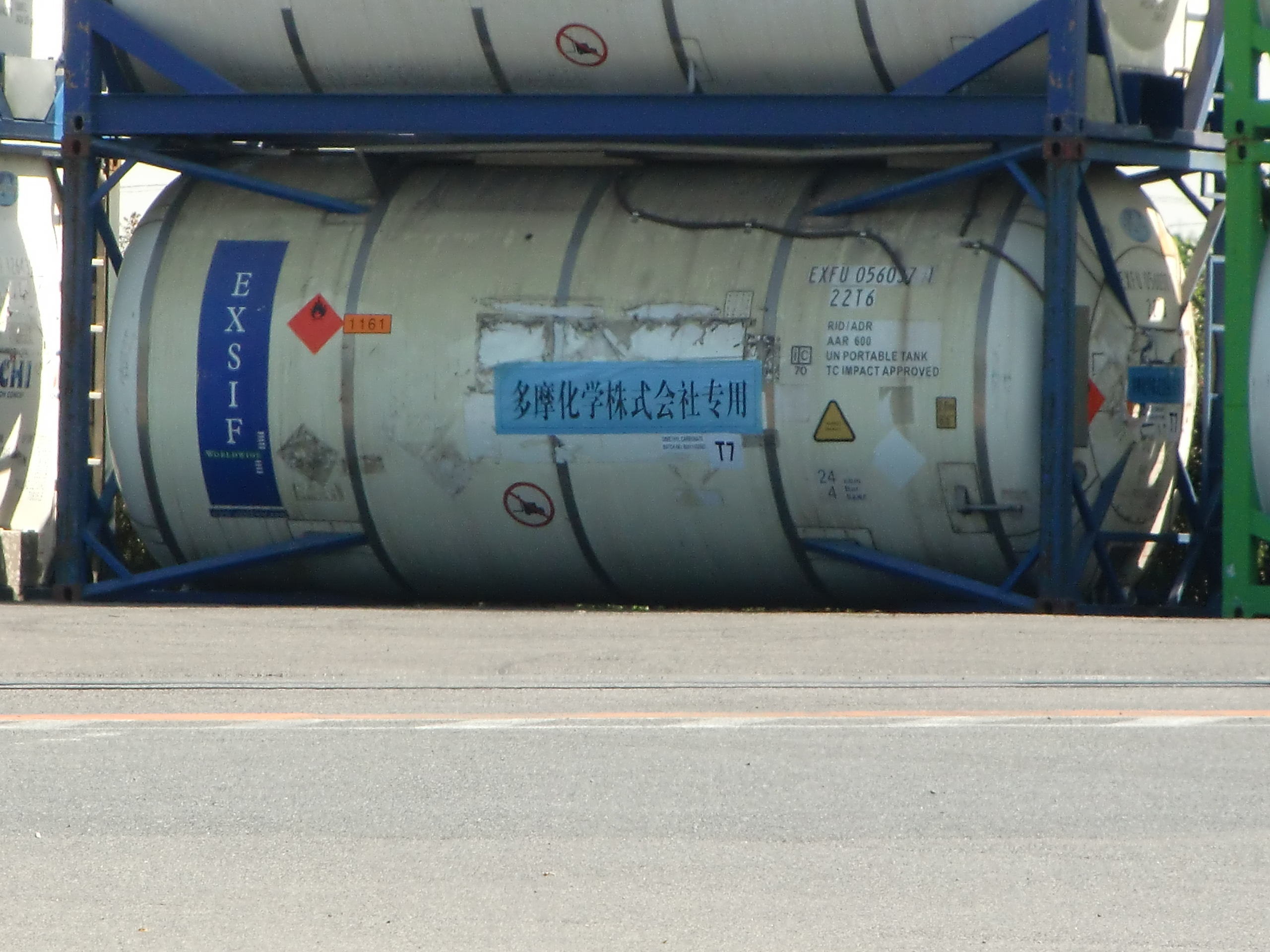
Container used to transport the substance, shown in Japan.

== Production ==
World production in 1997 was estimated at 1000 barrels a day. Production of dimethyl carbonate worldwide is limited to Asia, the Middle East, and Europe.

Dimethyl carbonate is traditionally prepared by the reaction of phosgene and methanol. Methyl chloroformate is produced as an intermediate:

COCl_{2} + CH_{3}OH → CH_{3}OCOCl + HCl
CH_{3}OCOCl + CH_{3}OH → CH_{3}OCO_{2}CH_{3} + HCl

This synthesis route has been largely replaced by oxidative carbonylation. In this process, carbon monoxide and an oxidizer provide the equivalent of CO^{2+}:

CO + 1/2 O_{2} + 2 CH_{3}OH → (CH_{3}O)_{2}CO + H_{2}O

It can also be produced industrially by a transesterification of ethylene carbonate or propylene carbonate and methanol, which also affords respectively ethylene glycol or propylene glycol. This route is complicated by the methanol-DMC azeotrope, which requires azeotropic distillation or other techniques.

== Reactions and potential applications ==
=== Methylating agent ===
Dimethyl carbonate methylates anilines, carboxylic acids, and phenols, albeit usually slowly. Sometimes these reactions require the use of an autoclave.

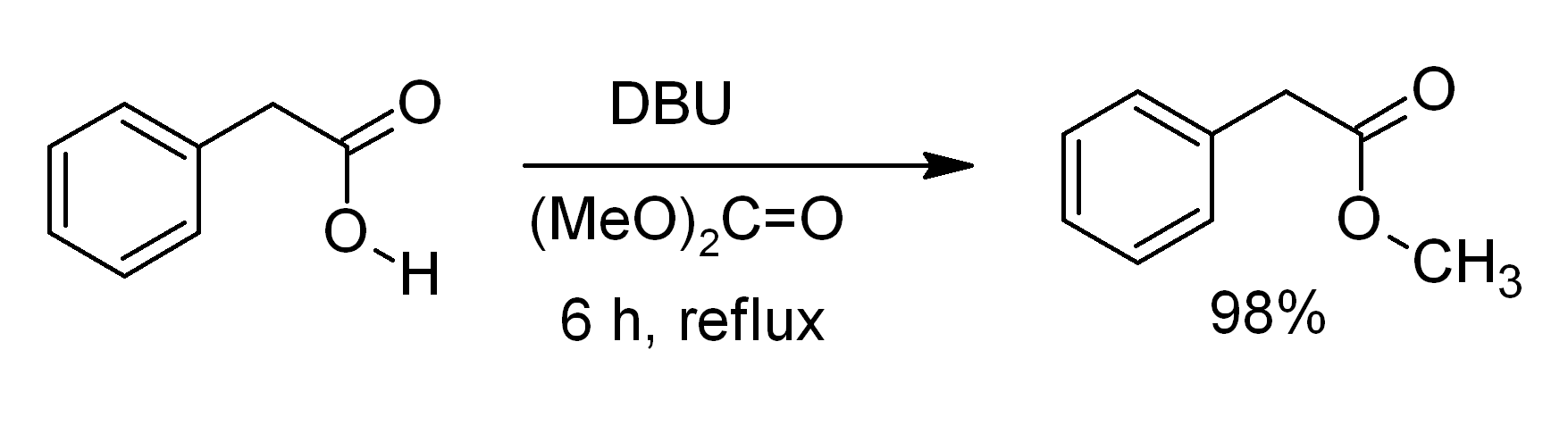

Dimethyl carbonate's main benefit over other methylating reagents such as iodomethane and dimethyl sulfate is its low toxicity. Additionally, it is biodegradable. Unfortunately, it is a relatively weak methylating agent compared to these traditional reagents.

=== Solvent ===
In the US, dimethyl carbonate was exempted under the definition of volatile organic compounds (VOCs) by the U.S. EPA in 2009. Due to its classification as VOC exempt, dimethyl carbonate has grown in popularity and applications as a replacement for methyl ethyl ketone (MEK) and parachlorobenzotrifluoride, as well as tert-butyl acetate until it too was exempted. Dimethyl carbonate has an ester- or alcohol-like odor, which is more favorable to users than most hydrocarbon solvents it replaces. Dimethyl carbonate has an evaporation rate of 3.22 (butyl acetate = 1.0), which slightly slower than MEK (3.8) and ethyl acetate (4.1), and faster than toluene (2.0) and isopropanol (1.7). Dimethyl carbonate has solubility profile similar to common glycol ethers, meaning dimethyl carbonate can dissolve most common coating resins except perhaps rubber based resins. Hildebrand solubility parameter is 20.3 MPa and Hansen solubility parameters are: dispersion = 15.5, polar = 3.9, H bonding = 9.7. Dimethyl carbonate is partially soluble in water up to 13%, however it is hydrolyzed in water-based systems over time to methanol and CO_{2} unless properly buffered. Dimethyl carbonate can freeze at same temperatures as water, it can be thawed out with no loss of properties to itself or coatings based on dimethyl carbonate.

=== Intermediate in polycarbonate synthesis ===
A large captive use of dimethyl carbonate is for the production of diphenyl carbonate through transesterification with phenol. Diphenyl carbonate is a widely used raw material for the synthesis of bisphenol-A-polycarbonate in a melt polycondensation process, the resulting product being recyclable by reversing the process and transesterifying the polycarbonate with phenol to yield diphenyl carbonate and bisphenol A.

=== Alternative fuel additive ===
There is also interest in using this compound as a fuel oxygenate additive.

=== In lithium-ion and lithium-metal batteries ===
Similar to ethylene carbonate, dimethyl carbonate forms an electronically insulating Li^{+}-conducting film at negative electrode potentials. However, the film in dry DMC solutions is not as effective in passivating the negative electrode as the film in wet solutions. For this reason dimethyl carbonate is rarely used in lithium batteries without a co-solvent.

== Safety ==
DMC is a flammable liquid with a flash point of 31 °C, which is less than acetone, methyl acetate and methyl ethyl ketone. The Protective action criteria (PAC), which, as set by the US Department of Energy, describes the risk of dimethyl carbonate to emergency response personnel in three levels:

Dimethyl Carbonate
PAC-1	PAC-2	PAC-3
11 ppm	120 ppm	700 ppm

DMC is metabolized by the body to methanol and carbon dioxide, so accidental ingestion should be treated in the same manner as methanol poisoning.
