= Otera's catalyst =

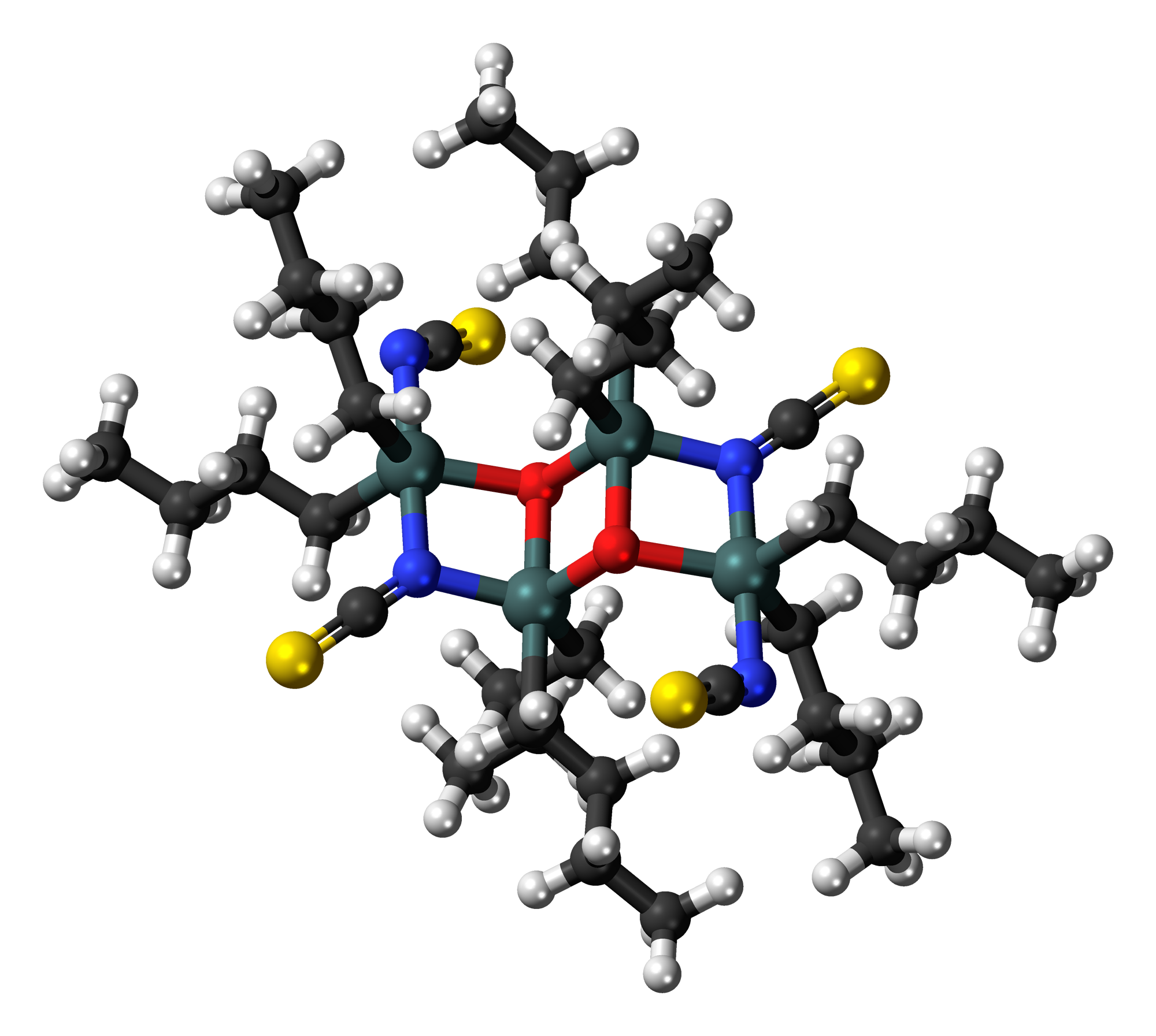

Names
- Other names Octabutyltetrathiocyanatostannoxane

Identifiers
CAS Number	95971-03-2
3D model (JSmol)	Interactive image
ChemSpider	17621074
PubChem CID	16689150
- InChI: InChI=1S/8C4H9.4CNS.2O.4Sn/c8*1-3-4-2;4*2-1-3;;;;;;/h8*1,3-4H2,2H3;;;;;;;;;;/q;;;;;;;;4*-1;;;4*+1 Key: BCLBTLOINGPAIT-UHFFFAOYSA-N
- SMILES: CCCC[Sn]1(N(=C=S)[Sn]2(O1[Sn]3(O2[Sn](N3=C=S)(CCCC)(CCCC)N=C=S)(CCCC)CCCC)(CCCC)CCCC)(CCCC)N=C=S

Properties
Chemical formula	C_{36}H_{72}N_{4}O_{2}S_{4}Sn_{4}
Molar mass	1196.08 g·mol^{−1}
- Except where otherwise noted, data are given for materials in their standard state (at 25 °C [77 °F], 100 kPa). verify (what is ?) Infobox references

Otera's catalyst, named after Japanese chemist Junzo Otera, is an organostannane compound which has been used as a transesterification catalyst. This isothiocyanate compound is a member of a family of organostannanes reported by Wada and coworkers, and elaborated upon by Otera and coworkers.

== Preparation ==
This class of compounds may be prepared generally by the reaction of an organotin halide and oxide:

2 R_{2}SnO + 2 R_{2}SnX_{2} → (XR_{2}SnOSnR_{2}X)_{2}

In particular, the thiocyanate compound was prepared by the reaction of dibutyltin oxide with dibutyltin diisothiocyanate. Otherwise, this compound is not commercially available.

== Applications ==
This isothiocyanate compound can be used as a transesterification catalyst. Although it is not well known, it has been used in a number of total syntheses.

In this application, the reaction occurs via the displacement of the bridging isothiocyanate ligands with the incoming alcohol to form an alcohol-bridged active catalyst. Tin acts as the Lewis acid, and gives the transesterified product. The reaction must be performed in nonpolar solvents in order to colocate the acid and alcohol at the catalytic center.
