= C1 chemistry =

One-carbon molecule chemical processes

C1 chemistry is the chemistry of one-carbon molecules. Although many compounds and ions contain only one carbon, stable and abundant C-1 feedstocks are the focus of research. Four compounds are of major industrial importance: methane, carbon monoxide, carbon dioxide, and methanol. Technologies that interconvert these species are often used massively to match supply to demand.

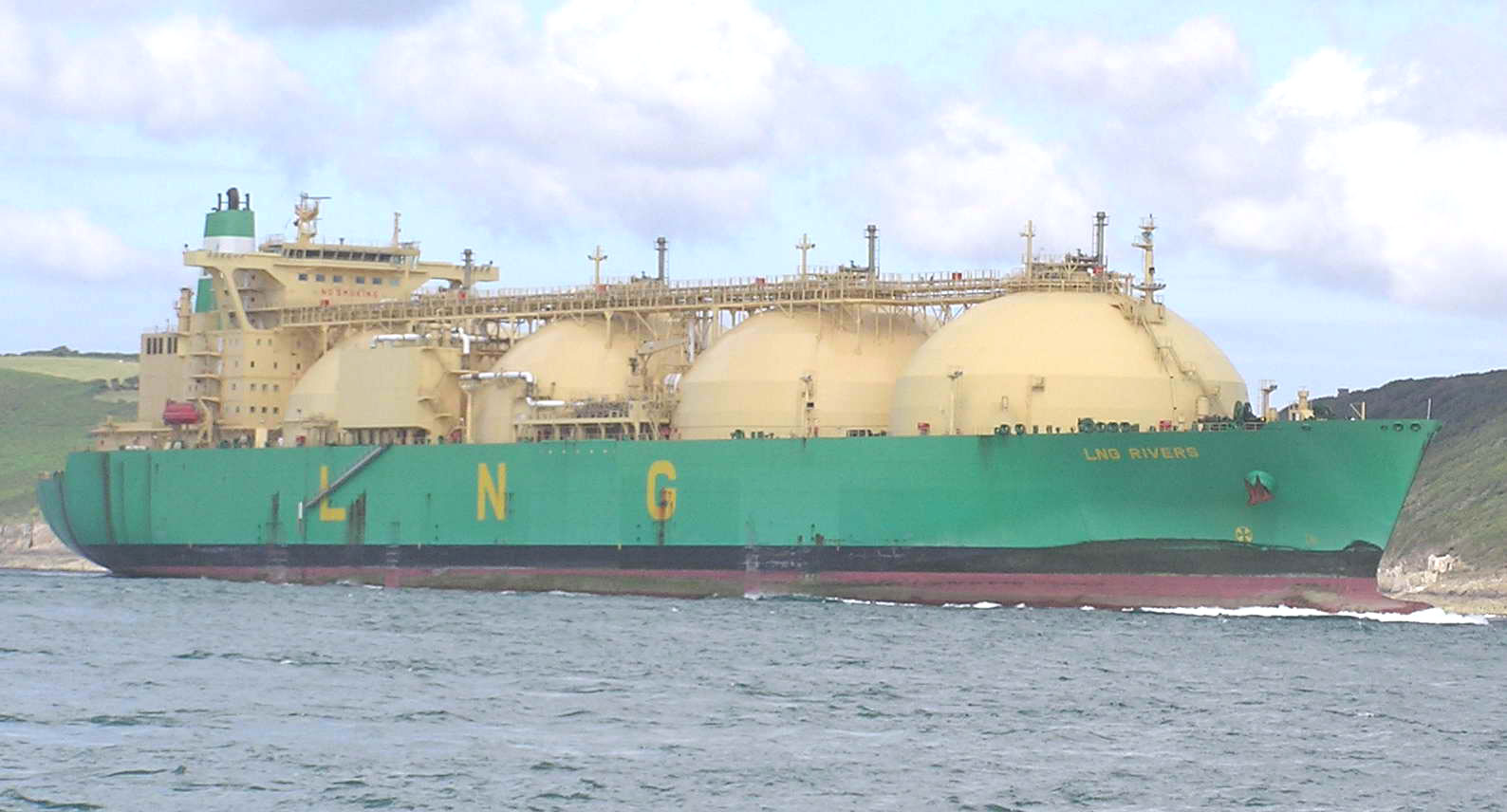
Expensive LNG tankers, or gas pipelines, are required to transport methane.

== Industrial processes ==
Carbon monoxide and methanol are important chemical feedstocks. CO is utilized by myriad carbonylation reactions. Together with hydrogen, it is the feed for the Fischer–Tropsch process, which affords liquid fuels. Methanol is the precursor to acetic acid, dimethyl ether, formaldehyde, and many methyl compounds (esters, amines, halides). A larger-scale application is methanol to olefins, which produces ethylene and propylene.

In contrast to carbon monoxide and methanol, methane and carbon dioxide have limited uses as feedstocks for chemicals and fuels. This disparity contrasts with the relative abundance of methane and carbon dioxide. Methane is often partially converted to carbon monoxide for utilization in Fischer-Tropsch processes. Of interest for upgrading methane is its oxidative coupling:

2CH_{4} + O_{2} → C_{2}H_{4} + 2H_{2}O

Conversion of carbon dioxide to unsaturated hydrocarbons via electrochemical reduction is a hopeful avenue of research. Still, no stable and economic technology has yet been developed.

== Biochemistry ==
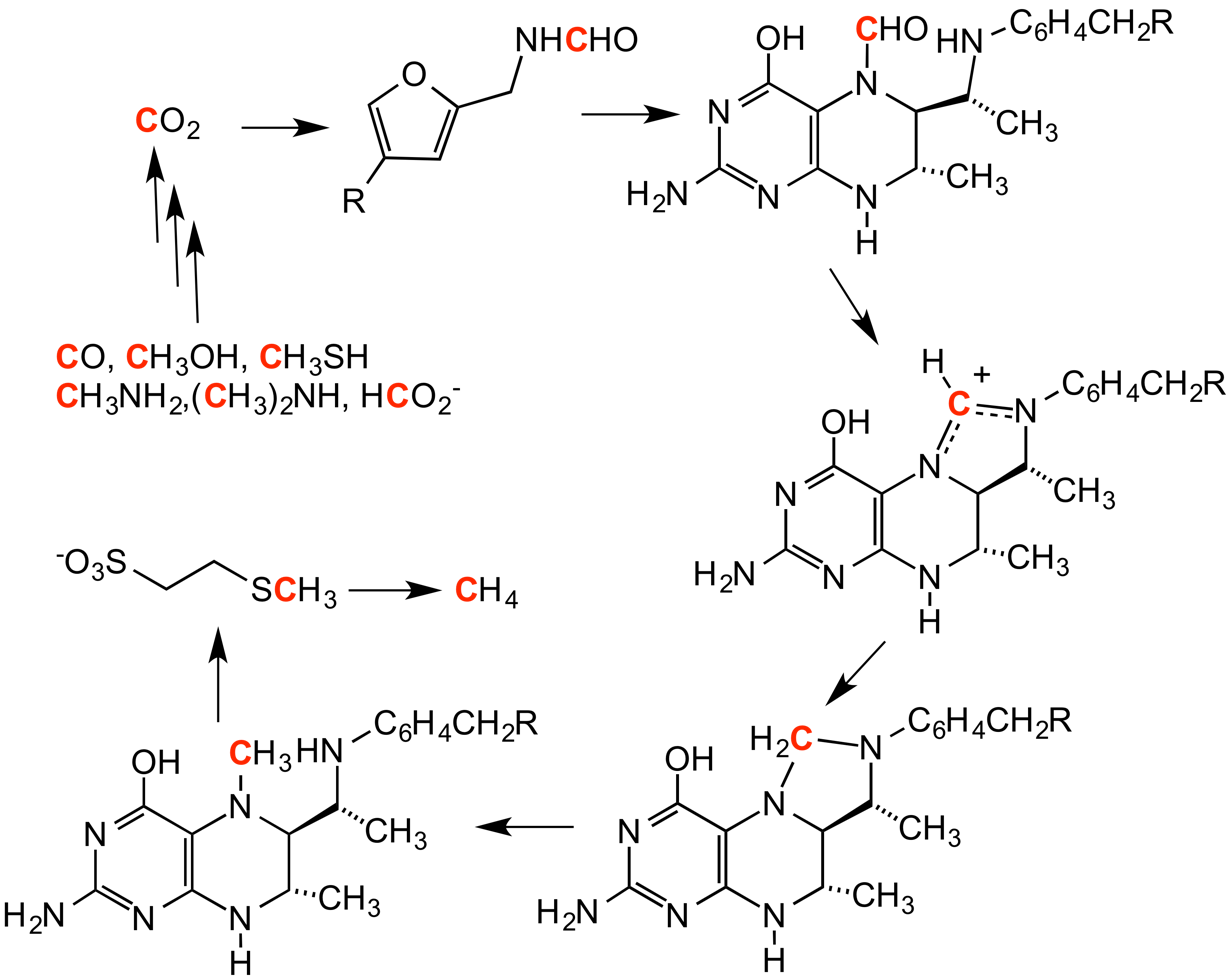
Cycle for methanogenesis, showing intermediates.

Methane, carbon monoxide, carbon dioxide, and methanol are substrates and products of enzymatic processes.

In methanogenesis, carbon monoxide, carbon dioxide, and methanol are converted to methane. Methanogenesis by methanogenic archaea is reversible.

In photosynthesis, carbon dioxide and water are converted to sugars (and O_{2}), the energy for this (thermally) uphill reaction being provided by sunlight.
