= Solid-state electrolyte =

Type of solid ionic conductor electrolyte

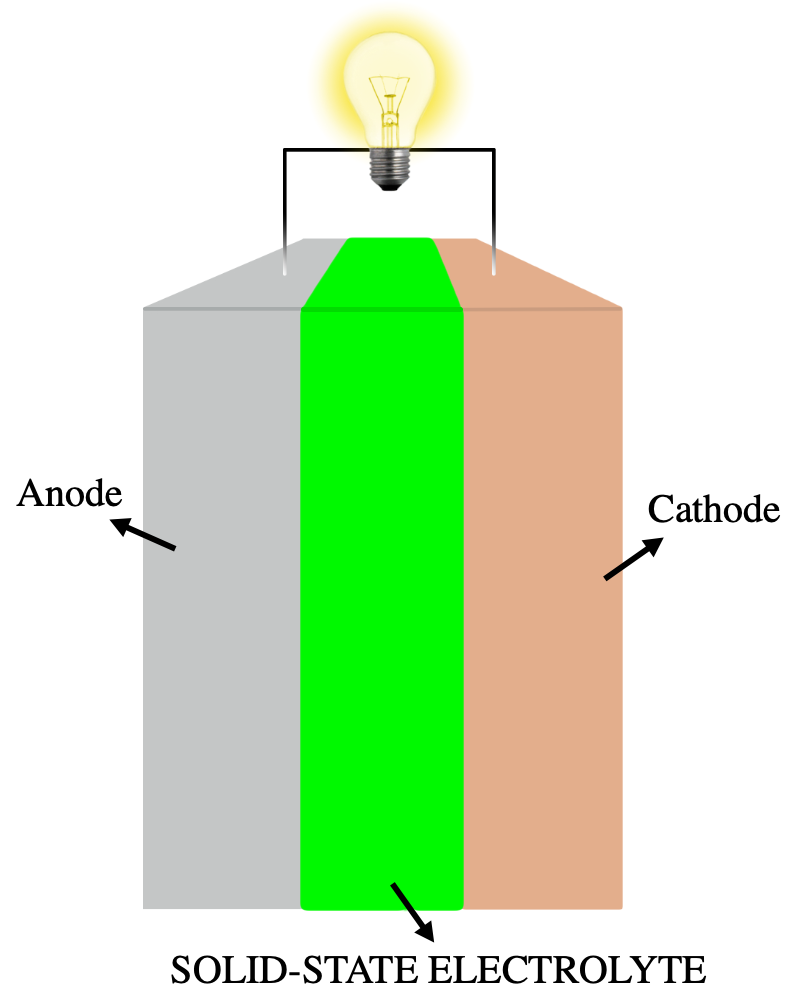
All Solid-State Battery with the solid-state electrolyte.

A solid-state electrolyte (SSE) is a solid ionic conductor and electron-insulating material and it is the characteristic component of the solid-state battery. It is useful for applications in electrical energy storage in substitution of the liquid electrolytes found in particular in the lithium-ion battery. Their main advantages are their absolute safety, no issues of leakages of toxic organic solvents, low flammability, non-volatility, mechanical and thermal stability, easy processability, low self-discharge, higher achievable power density and cyclability. This makes possible, for example, the use of a lithium metal anode in a practical device, without the intrinsic limitations of a liquid electrolyte thanks to the property of lithium dendrite suppression in the presence of a solid-state electrolyte membrane. The use of a high-capacity and low reduction potential anode, like lithium with a specific capacity of 3860 mAh/g and a reduction potential of -3.04 V vs standard hydrogen electrode, in substitution of the traditional low capacity graphite, which exhibits a theoretical capacity of 372 mAh/g in its fully lithiated state of LiC_{6}, is the first step in the realization of a lighter, thinner and cheaper rechargeable battery. This allows for gravimetric and volumetric energy densities high enough to achieve 500 miles per single charge in an electric vehicle. Despite these promising advantages, there are still many limitations that are hindering the transition of SSEs from academic research to large-scale production, mainly the poor ionic conductivity compared to that of liquid counterparts.

== History ==
The first inorganic solid-state electrolytes were discovered by Michael Faraday in the nineteenth century, these being silver sulfide (Ag_{2}S) and lead(II) fluoride (PbF_{2}). The first polymeric material able to conduct ions at the solid-state was PEO, discovered in the 1970s by V. Wright. The importance of the discovery was recognized in the early 1980s.

However, unresolved fundamental issues remain in order to fully understand the behavior of all-solid batteries, especially in the area of electrochemical interfaces. In recent years the needs of safety and performance improvements with respect to the state-of-the-art Li-ion chemistry are making solid-state batteries very appealing and are now considered an encouraging technology to satisfy the need for long range battery electric vehicles of the near future.

In March 2020, the Samsung Advanced Institute of Technology (SAIT) published research on an all-solid-state battery (ASSB) using an argyrodite-based solid-state electrolyte with a demonstrated energy density of 900 WhL^{−1} and a stable cyclability of more than 1000 cycles, reaching for the first time a value close to the 1000 WhL^{−1}. This was achieved by using warm isostatic pressing to improve the contact between the electrode and the electrolyte.

== Properties ==
For Solid State Batteries (SSBs) / Solid Electrolytes (SEs) to become a major market challenger it must meet some key performance measurements. The major criteria that an SSB/SE should have are:

- Ionic conductivity: Historically, SSBs have suffered from low ionic conductivities due to poor interfacial kinetics and mobility of ions in general. Hence an SE with a high ionic conductivity is of primary importance. High ionic conductivity (at least higher than 10^{−4} S/cm) can be measured through electrochemical impedance spectroscopy (EIS) analysis.
- Volumetric Energy Density: Along with high ionic conductivity the candidate must have the ability to be stacked within a single package, so it supplies high energy density to the Electric Vehicles. A high volumetric energy density is required so that the driving range of EVs can be increased between charges.
- Power density: Sufficient power density (W/L) is needed to make energy available when needed which is also a measure of how quickly charging and discharging can take place.
- Cycle life: Long cycle and shelf life are needed as conventional Li-ion batteries degrade after a few years.
- Ionic transference number: High ionic transference number (the closest possible to 1) can be measured through a combination of chronoamperometry (CA) and EIS analysis.
- Thermal, mechanical and electrochemical Stability: During device or car operation the SSBs may undergo large volume variations and face mechanical stress. Also, electrochemical stability at high operating electrode potentials which are of advantage when it comes to high energy density. Hence, it is important that their mechanical, thermal, and electrochemical stability are considered. High mechanical strength (at least tens of MPa) can be measured through a traditional tensile test. Wide electrochemical stability windows (ESW) (at least 4-5 V) can be measured through linear sweep voltammetry (LSV) or cyclic voltammetry (CV).
- Compatibility: The SE must be compatible with the electrode materials used in batteries as there is already a high chance of increased resistance in SSBs due to limited contact area between electrolyte and electrode materials. It should also be stable in contact with Lithium metal. It should be lighter so that it can be used in portable electronic devices. High compatibility with the electrode material can be measured through EIS analysis repeated over more consecutive days.
- Economic fabrication technologies: If SEs contain expensive materials like Ge it will make the production cost go up significantly. The production of an exemplar SSB will require the convergence of uncomplicated fabrication technologies like particle dispersion, mechanical mixing, film formation etc.

It is hard for one material to fulfill all the above criteria, hence a number of other approaches can be used for example a hybrid electrolyte system which combines the advantages of inorganic and polymer electrolytes.

== Categories ==
SSEs have the same role of a traditional liquid electrolyte and they are classified into all-solid-state electrolyte and quasi-solid-state electrolyte (QSSE). All-solid-state electrolytes are furthermore divided into inorganic solid electrolyte (ISE), solid polymer electrolyte (SPE) and composite polymer electrolyte (CPE). On the other hand, a QSSE, also called gel polymer electrolyte (GPE), is a freestanding membrane that contains a certain amount of liquid component immobilized inside the solid matrix. In general the nomenclatures SPE and GPE are used interchangeably but they have a substantially different ionic conduction mechanism: SPEs conducts ions through the interaction with the substitutional groups of the polymer chains, while GPEs conducts ions mainly in the solvent or plasticizer.

=== All-solid-state electrolyte ===
All-solid-state electrolytes are divided into inorganic solid electrolyte (ISE), solid polymer electrolyte (SPE) and composite polymer electrolyte (CPE). They are solid at room temperature and the ionic movement occurs at the solid-state. Their main advantage is the complete removal of any liquid component aimed to a greatly enhanced safety of the overall device. The main limitation is the ionic conductivity that tends to be much lower compared to a liquid counterpart.

==== Inorganic Solid Electrolytes (ISEs) ====
Inorganic solid electrolytes (ISEs) are a class of all-solid-state electrolytes composed of inorganic materials in either crystalline or glassy form, which conduct ions via diffusion through the solid lattice. These electrolytes present significant advantages including relatively high ionic conductivity (on the order of 10^{−3}-10^{−4} S/cm at room temperature) and a high mechanical modulus (GPa scale), as well as a high cation-transfer number.

Traditional ISEs are typically single-phase materials. Oxide-based conductors are widely studied for their excellent chemical stability and mechanical robustness. Common crystalline structure families include oxide conductors such as NASICON-type LTP, LATP and LAGP, garnet-type LLZO, and perovskite-type LLTO. Sulfide-based ISEs include LGPS-type Li_{10}GeP_{2}S_{12} and argyrodite-like Li_{6}PS_{5}X; these materials can offer high ionic conductivities and comparatively soft mechanical behavior, which benefits interfacial contact. Kamaya et al. reported Li_{10}GeP_{2}S_{12} in 2011 as a lithium superionic conductor with room-temperature lithium-ion conductivity comparable to liquid electrolytes. Other inorganic families include lithium nitrides, lithium hydrides, lithium phosphidotrielates and phosphidotetrelates.

However, despite these strengths, single-phase ISEs face significant challenges. Oxide ceramics, though mechanically robust, tend to be brittle, develop high interfacial resistance at the electrode/electrolyte interface, and often require high sintering or stack pressure to achieve good contact. On the other hand, sulfide and halide materials, while offering high ionic conductivity, may suffer from chemical instability (for example moisture sensitivity or undesirable reaction with Li metal), a limited electrochemical window, and mechanical softness.

==== Solid polymer electrolyte (SPE) ====
Solid polymer electrolytes (SPE) are defined as a solvent-free salt solution in a polymer host material that conducts ions through the polymer chains. Compared to ISEs, SPEs are much easier to process, generally by solution casting, making them greatly compatible with large-scale manufacturing processes. Moreover, they possess higher elasticity and plasticity giving stability at the interface, flexibility and improved resistance to volume changes during operation. A good dissolution of Li salts, low glass transition temperature (T_{g}), electrochemical compatibility with most common electrode materials, a low degree of crystallinity, mechanical stability, low temperature sensitivity are all characteristics for the ideal SPE candidate. In general though the ionic conductivity is lower than the ISEs and their rate capability is restricted, limiting fast charging. PEO-based SPE is the first solid-state polymer in which ionic conductivity was demonstrated both through inter and intra molecular through ion hopping, thanks to the segmental motion of the polymeric chains because of the great ion complexation capability of the ether groups, but they suffer from the low room-temperature ionic conductivity (10^{−5} S/cm) due to the high degree of crystallinity.

Copolymerization, crosslinking, interpenetration, and blending may also be used as polymer/polymer coordination to tune the properties of the SPEs and achieve better performances, introducing in the polymeric chains polar groups like ethers, carbonyls or nitriles drastically improve the dissolution of the lithium salts. Thus the main alternatives to polyether-based SPEs are polycarbonates, polyesters, polynitriles (e.g. PAN), polyalcohols (e.g. PVA), polyamines (e.g. PEI), polysiloxane (e.g. PDMS) and fluoropolymers (e.g. PVDF, PVDF-HFP). Bio-polymers like lignin, chitosan and cellulose are also gaining a lot of interest as standalone SPEs or blended with other polymers, on one side for their environmentally friendliness and on the other for their high complexation capability on the salts. Furthermore, different strategies are considered to increase the ionic conductivity of SPEs and the amorphous-to-crystalline ratio.

==== Composite polymer electrolytes ====
Composite polymer electrolytes (CPEs) present a promising solution to address the limitations of traditional inorganic solid electrolytes (ISEs), such as garnet-based (LLZO) and sulfide-based (LGPS) materials, which often exhibit poor mechanical compatibility with lithium electrodes and high interfacial resistance. CPEs, also referred to as composite solid electrolytes (CSEs) in some literature, integrate small inorganic particles into a polymeric matrix, thereby combining the high ionic conductivity of inorganic phases with the flexibility and enhanced electrode compatibility of polymers.

The inorganic fillers incorporated into the polymer matrix can be categorized as either inert or active. Inert fillers, such as Al_{2}O_{3}, TiO_{2}, and SiO_{2}, primarily function to reduce the crystallinity of the polymer matrix and improve mechanical strength, thereby suppressing lithium dendrite growth. For instance, studies have demonstrated that incorporating SiO_{2} into a PEO-based electrolyte significantly enhances its thermal stability and mechanical strength, leading to extended cycle life in lithium symmetric cells. Active fillers, which include fast-ion conductors like LLZO, LLTO, and LATP, not only reinforce the polymer matrix but also provide additional pathways for lithium-ion conduction, thereby increasing the overall ionic conductivity of the electrolyte. A notable example is the use of electrospun LATP nanosheets within a PVDF matrix, which established continuous ion transport channels and achieved a high ionic conductivity of 6.15×10^{−4} S/cm at room temperature. Structural design strategies, such as constructing three-dimensional fiber networks using materials like PAN/LLZTO, have been employed to create continuous Li^{+} transport channels within PEO-based CPEs, further enhancing ionic conductivity and mechanical properties.

By mitigating the rigid interfacial contact issues inherent in pure ISEs and offering superior processability, CPEs effectively lower interfacial resistance and contribute to more stable cycling performance in all-solid-state lithium metal batteries.

=== Quasi-solid-state electrolyte ===
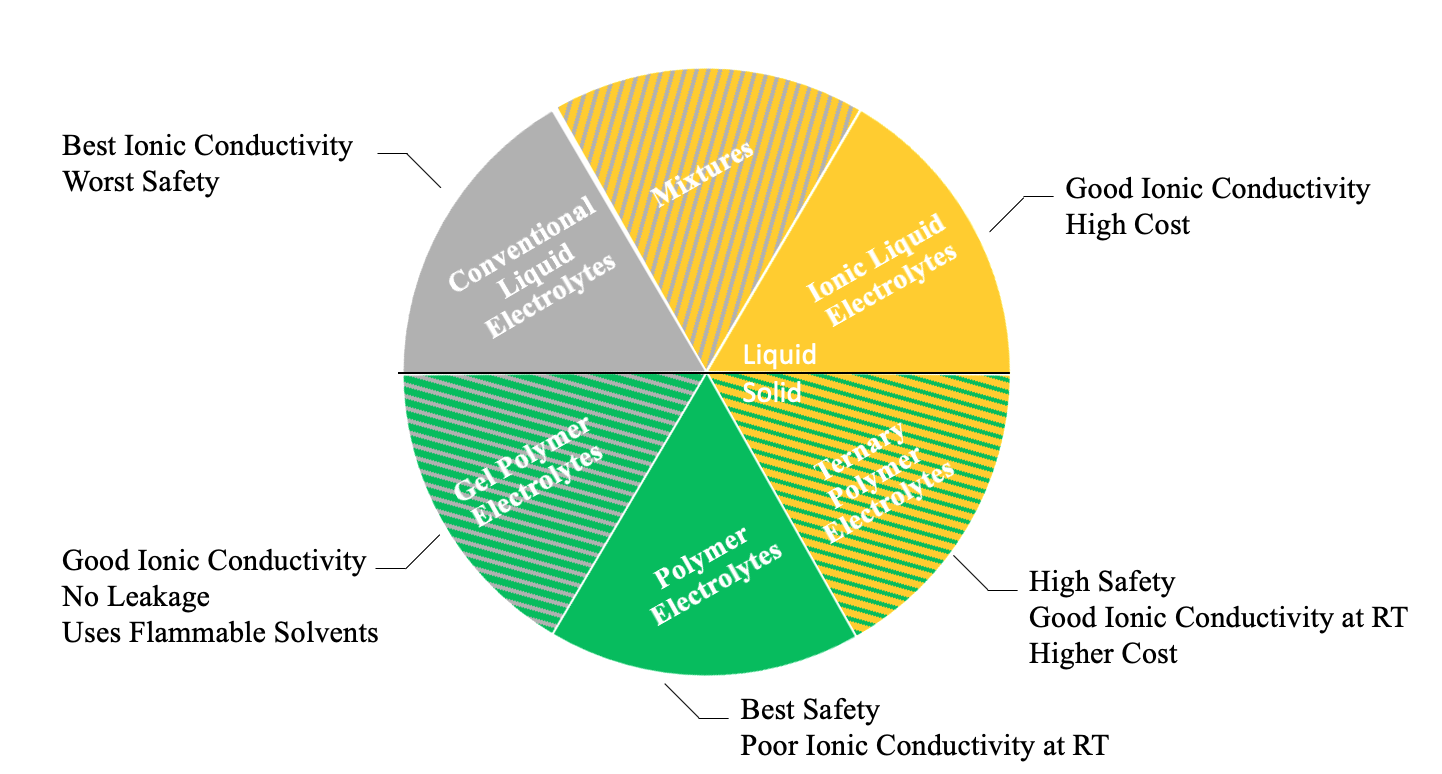
Comparison of different polymer based quasi-solid-state electrolyes

Quasi solid-state electrolytes (QSSEs) are a wide class of composite compounds consisting of a liquid electrolyte and a solid matrix. This liquid electrolyte serves as a percolating pathway of ion conduction while the solid matrix adds mechanical stability to the material as a whole. As the name suggests, QSSEs can have a range of mechanical properties from strong solid-like materials to those in a paste form. QSSEs can be subdivided into a number of categories including gel polymer electrolytes (GPEs), Ionogel electrolytes, and gel electrolytes (also known as "soggy sand" electrolytes). The most common QSSE, GPEs have a substantially different ionic conduction mechanism than SPEs, which conduct ions through the interaction with the substitutional groups of the polymer chains. Meanwhile, GPEs conduct ions mainly in the solvent, which acts as plasticizer. The solvent acts to increase the ionic conductivity of the electrolyte as well as soften the electrolyte for improved interfacial contact. The matrix of GPEs consist of a polymer network swollen in a solvent that contains the active ions (e.g., Li^{+}, Na^{+}, Mg^{2+}, etc.). This allows for the composite to contain both the mechanical properties of solids and the high transport properties of liquids. A number of polymer hosts have been used in GPEs, including PEO, PAN, PMMA, PVDF-HFP, etc. The polymers are synthesized with increased porosity to incorporate solvents such as ethylene carbonate (EC), propylene carbonate (PC), diethyl carbonate (DEC), and dimethyl carbonate (DMC). Low molecular weight poly(ethylene glycol) (PEG) or other ethers or aprotic organic solvents with high dielectric constant like dimethylsulfoxide (DMSO) can also be mixed the SPE matrix. UV and thermal cross-linking are useful ways to polymerize in-situ the GPE directly in contact with the electrodes for a perfectly adherent interface. Values of ionic conductivity on the order of 1 mS/cm can be easily achieved with GPEs, as demonstrate the numerous research articles published.

Emerging subclasses of QSSEs use matrix materials and solvents. Ionogels, for example use ionic liquids as a solvent that has improved safety including non-flammability and stability at high temperatures. Matrix materials in ionogels can vary from polymer materials to inorganic nano-materials. These matrix materials (as with all QSSEs) provide mechanical stability with a storage moduli up to 1 MPa or higher. Meanwhile, these materials can provide ionic conductivities on the order of 1 mS/cm without using flammable solvents. However, gel electrolytes (i.e. "soggy sand" electrolytes) can achieve liquid-like ionic conductivities (~ 10 mS/cm) while being in the solid state. Matrix materials such as SiO_{2} nanoparticles are typically paired with low viscosity solvents (e.g., ethylene carbonate (EC)) to create a gel, whose properties can be modified based on the matrix loading. Matrix content ranging from 10 to 40 wt% can shift the mechanical properties of the electrolyte from a soft paste into a hard gel. However, a tradeoff between mechanical strength and ionic conductivity as one goes up with changing matrix content the other suffers. Despite this, matrix content in these materials can have added benefits including enhanced lithium transference number due to functionalized matrix materials. These new classes of QSSEs are an active area of research to develop the optimal combination of matrix and solvent.

== Applications ==
Solid-state electrolyte are primarily utilized in energy storage systems like next-generation high-energy-density batteries, and supercapacitor

=== Solid-state batteries ===
Solid-state electrolytes are primarily applied in advanced battery technologies, particularly lithium-ion batteries, sodium batteries, metal-based batteries, because of its advantages such as improved safety, energy density, and power density, with potential applications in flexible electronics. There are many type of materials as solid state electrolyte that applied to batteries has been investigated including oxide, sulfide, polymer, Garnet-type and composite.

=== Supercapacitors ===
Solid-state electrolytes enable safer, higher-performance supercapacitors by replacing flammable liquid electrolytes while maintaining or exceeding energy storage capabilities.

=== Solar cells ===
Solid-state electrolytes are applied in dye-sensitized solar cells (DSSCs) to replace volatile liquid electrolytes, improving long-term stability while maintaining competitive power conversion efficiencies. Multiple material strategies have been explored: polymer composites, silica-based composites.

=== Organic electrochemical transistors (OECTs) ===
Solid-state electrolytes enable organic electrochemical transistor (OECTs) for integrated circuits, bioelectronics, and wearable sensors by replacing liquid electrolytes with materials like ion gels, hydrogels, and polyelectrolytes. Solid state electrolytes can overcome and improve liquid electrolytes limitations, it enhances OECTs performance with high sensitivity and stability under various conditions, including continuous bias, long-term operation, and temperature variations. Several materials have been investigated for solid state OECTs: Ionic liquid crystal elastomers (ILCEs), polymer, a chitosan biopolymer.

=== Gas and chemical sensors ===
Solid-state electrolytes are widely applied in gas and chemical sensors for detecting multiple gaseous species (O₂, H₂, CO, CO₂, NH₃,...) across diverse industrial and environmental monitoring applications. It enhances gas sensor performance and improves selectivity, sensitivity and stability

=== Electrochromic and smart windows ===
Electrochromic devices (smart windows, displays, mirrors) often use polymer, gel, or inorganic solid electrolytes as the ion-conducting layer between the electrochromic and counter electrodes. Solid electrolytes improve leakage resistance, mechanical stability, and device lifetime compared with liquid electrolytes, enabling large-area and flexible smart windows.

== See also ==
- Solid-state battery
- Li-ion battery
- Lithium-sulfur battery
- Research in lithium-ion batteries
