= Lithium aluminium germanium phosphate =

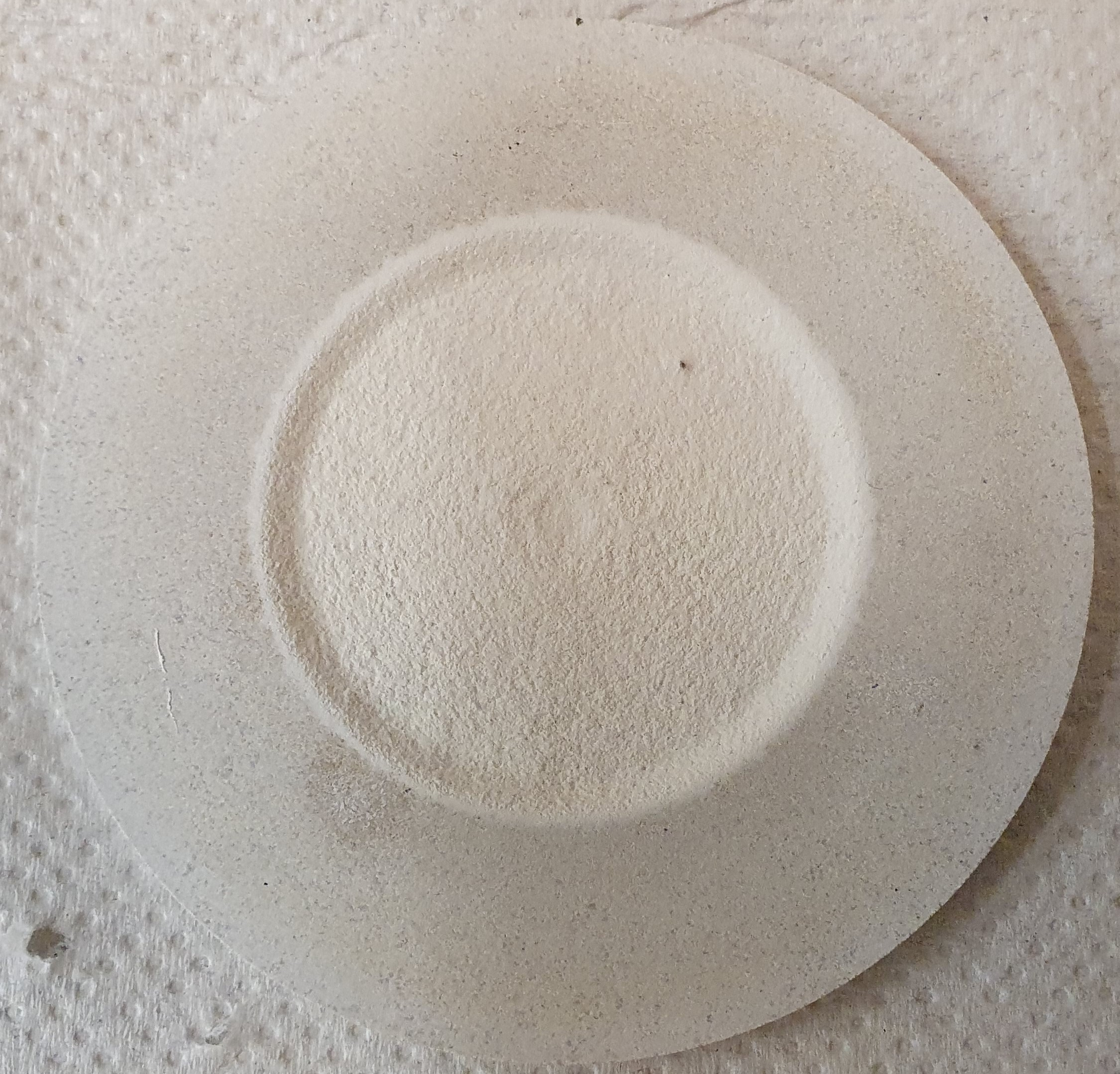
- Lithium aluminium germanium phosphate (LAGP) sputtering target

Names
- Other names LAGP, LAGPO

Identifiers
3D model (JSmol)	Interactive image
- InChI: InChI=1S/Al.3Ge.3Li.6H3O4P/c;;;;;;;6*1-5(2,3)4/h;;;;;;;6*(H3,1,2,3,4)/q+3;3*+4;3*+1;;;;;;/p-18 Key: XJNHKLFXARHZKW-UHFFFAOYSA-A
- SMILES: [Li+].[Li+].[Li+].[Al+3].[Ge+4].[Ge+4].[Ge+4].[O-]P(=O)([O-])[O-].[O-]P(=O)([O-])[O-].[O-]P(=O)([O-])[O-].[O-]P(=O)([O-])[O-].[O-]P(=O)([O-])[O-].[O-]P(=O)([O-])[O-]

Properties
Chemical formula	Li_{1.5}Al_{0.5}Ge_{1.5}(PO_{4})_{3}
Molar mass	417.77 g/mol
Appearance	white bulk crystal or powder
Density	3.5615 g/cm^{3} (theoretical)

Structure
Crystal structure	Rhombohedral
Space group	R3̅c

Hazards
- GHS labelling
Pictograms	(GHS07: Exclamation mark)
Signal word	Warning
Hazard statements	H302, H315, H319, H335
Precautionary statements	P261, P264, P270, P280, P301+P310, P304+P340, P305+P351+P338, P332+P313, P337+P313, P362, P403+P233, P405, P501
Safety data sheet (SDS)	Angstrom Sciences, Inc.

Related compounds
Related compounds	Lithium Aluminium Titanium Phosphate (LATP), Lithium Germanium Phosphate (LGP), Lithium Titanium Phosphate (LTP)
- Except where otherwise noted, data are given for materials in their standard state (at 25 °C [77 °F], 100 kPa). Infobox references

Lithium aluminium germanium phosphate, typically known with the acronyms LAGP or LAGPO, is an inorganic ceramic solid material whose general formula is Li_{1+x}Al_{x}Ge_{2-x}(PO_{4})_{3}. LAGP belongs to the NASICON (Sodium Super Ionic Conductors) family of solid conductors and has been applied as a solid electrolyte in all-solid-state lithium-ion batteries. Typical values of ionic conductivity in LAGP at room temperature are in the range of 10^{–5} - 10^{–4} S/cm, even if the actual value of conductivity is strongly affected by stoichiometry, microstructure, and synthesis conditions. Compared to lithium aluminium titanium phosphate (LATP), which is another phosphate-based lithium solid conductor, the absence of titanium in LAGP improves its stability towards lithium metal. In addition, phosphate-based solid electrolytes have superior stability against moisture and oxygen compared to sulfide-based electrolytes like Li_{10}GeP_{2}S_{12} (LGPS) and can be handled safely in air, thus simplifying the manufacture process. Since the best performances are encountered when the stoichiometric value of x is 0.5, the acronym LAGP usually indicates the particular composition of Li_{1.5}Al_{0.5}Ge_{1.5}(PO_{4})_{3}, which is also the typically used material in battery applications.

== Properties ==
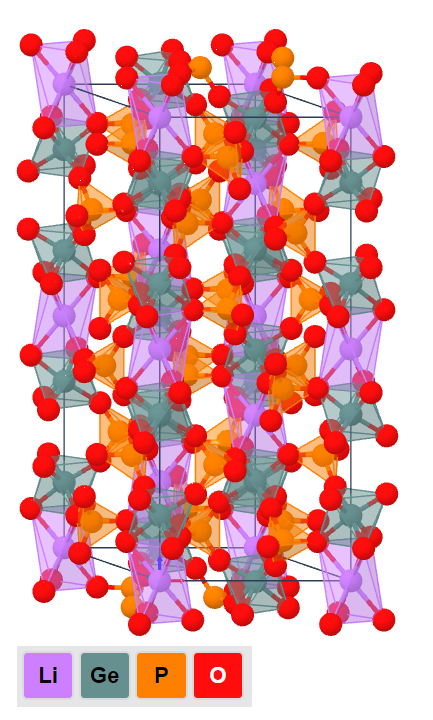
LGP crystal structure; lithium ions are occupying Li(1) sites. In LAGP, Ge atoms will be partially substituted by Al atoms and additional lithium ions will be introduced in empty Li(2) sites.

=== Crystal structure ===
Lithium-containing NASICON-type crystals are described by the general formula LiM_{2}(PO_{4})_{3}, in which M stands for a metal or a metalloid (Ti, Zr, Hf, Sn, Ge), and display a complex three-dimensional network of corner-sharing MO_{6} octahedra and phosphate tetrahedra. Lithium ions are hosted in voids in between, which can be subdivided into three kinds of sites:

- Li(1) 6-fold coordinated sites at Wyckoff 6b position;
- Li(2) sites at Wyckoff 18e position;
- Li(3) sites at Wyckoff 36f position.

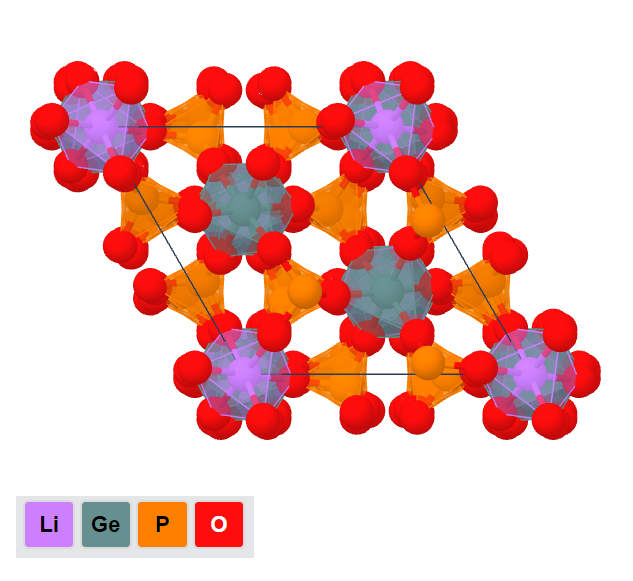
LGP crystal structure (top view).

In order to promote lithium conductivity at sufficiently high rates, Li(1) sites should be fully occupied and Li(2) sites should be fully empty. Li(3) sites are located between Li(1) and Li(2) sites and are occupied only when large tetravalent cations are present in the structure, such as Zr, Hf, and Sn. If some Ge^{4+} cations in the LiGe_{2}(PO_{4})_{3} (LGP) structure are partially replaced by Al^{3+} cations, the LAGP material is obtained with the general formula Li_{1+x}Al_{x}Ge_{2-x}(PO_{4})_{3}. The single-phase NASICON structure is stable with x between 0.1 and 0.6; when this limit is exceeded, a solid solution is no more possible and secondary phases tend to be formed. Although Ge^{4+} and Al^{3+} cations have very similar ionic radii (0.53 Å for Ge^{4+} vs. 0.535 Å for Al^{3+}), cationic substitution leads to compositional disorder and promotes the incorporation of a larger amount of lithium ions to achieve electrical neutrality. Additional lithium ions can be incorporated in either Li(2) or Li(3) empty sites.

In the available scientific literature, there is not a unique description of the sites available for lithium ions and of their atomic coordination, as well as of the sites directly involved during the conduction mechanism. For example, only two available sites, namely Li(1) and Li(2), are mentioned in some cases, while the Li(3) site is neither occupied nor involved in the conduction process. This results in the lack of unambiguous description of LAGP local crystal structure, especially concerning the arrangement of lithium ions and site occupancy when germanium is partially replaced by aluminium.

LAGP displays a rhombohedral unit cell with a space group R3̅c.

=== Vibrational properties ===
==== Factor group analysis ====
LAGP crystals belong to the space group D^{6}_{3d} - R3̅c. The factor group analysis of NASICON-type materials with general formula M^{I}M_{2}^{IV}PO_{4} (where M^{I} stands for a monovalent metal ion like Na^{+}, Li^{+} or K^{+}, and M^{IV} represents a tetravalent cation such as Ti^{4+}, Ge^{4+}, Sn^{4+}, Zr^{4+} or Hf^{4+}) is usually performed assuming the separation between internal vibrational modes (i.e. modes originating in PO_{4} units) and external modes (i.e. modes arising from the translations of the M^{I} and M^{IV} cations, from PO_{4} translations, and from PO_{4} librations).

Focusing on internal modes only, the factor group analysis for R3̅c space group identifies 14 Raman-active modes for the PO_{4} units: 6 of these modes correspond to stretching vibrations and 8 to bending vibrations.

Raman-active modes in NASICON materials
Vibration	Factor group	Assignment
ν_{1}	A_{1g} + E_{g}	Symmetric stretching
ν_{2}	2A_{1g} + 2E_{g}	Symmetric bending
ν_{3}	A_{1g} + 3E_{g}	Antisymmetric stretching
ν_{4}	A_{1g} + 3E_{g}	Antisymmetric bending

On the contrary, the analysis of external modes leads to many available vibrations: since the number of irreducible representations within the rhombohedral R3̅c space group is restricted, interactions among different modes could be expected and a clear assignment or discrimination becomes unfeasible.

==== Raman spectra ====
The vibrational properties of LAGP could be directly probed using Raman spectroscopy. LAGP shows the Raman features characteristic of all the NASICON-type materials, most of which caused by the vibrational motions of PO_{4} units. The main spectral regions in a Raman spectrum of NASICON-type materials are summarized in the following table.

Spectral markers of LAGP
Spectral region		Assignment
< 350 cm^{−1}	Low frequency	External modes due to translation of the M^{IV} cations (Ge^{4+} in the particular case of LAGP) or translation/libration motions of phosphate tetrahedra.
300 – 500 cm^{−1}	Low frequency	P – O – P symmetrical bending.
500 – 800 cm^{−1}	Medium frequency	P – O – P antisymmetric bending.
900 – 1300 cm^{−1}	High frequency	Stretching vibrations in PO_{4} tetrahedra. The discrimination between symmetric and antisymmetric stretching vibration is usually not possible.

The Raman spectra of LAGP are usually characterized by broad peaks, even when the material is in its crystalline form. Indeed, both the presence of aluminium ions in place of germanium ions and the extra lithium ions introduce structural and compositional disorder in the sublattice, resulting in peak broadening.

=== Transport properties ===
LAGP is a solid ionic conductor and features the two fundamental properties to be used as a solid-state electrolyte in lithium-ion batteries, namely a sufficiently high ionic conductivity and a negligible electronic conductivity. Indeed, during battery operations, LAGP should guarantee the easy and fast motion of lithium ions between cathode and anode, while preventing the transfer of electrons.

As stated in the description of the crystal structure, three kinds of sites are available for hosting lithium ions in the LAGP NASICON structure, i.e. the Li(1) sites, the Li(2) sites and the Li(3) sites. Ionic conduction occurs because of hopping of lithium ions from Li(1) to Li(2) sites or across two Li(3) sites. The bottleneck to ionic motion is represented by a triangular window delimited by three oxygen atoms between Li(1) and Li(2) sites.

The ionic conductivity $\sigma$ in LAGP follows the usual dependency on temperature expressed by an Arrhenius-type equation, which is typical of most of solid-state ionic conductors:

$\sigma = \frac{\sigma_0}{T}e^{-\frac{E_{a}}{k_{B}T}}$

where

σ_{0} is the pre-exponential factor,
T is the absolute temperature,
E_{a} is the activation energy for ionic transport,
k_{B} is the Boltzmann constant.

Typical values for the activation energies of bulk LAGP materials are in the range of 0.35 - 0.41 eV. Similarly, the room-temperature ionic conductivity is closely related to the synthesis conditions and to the actual material microstructure, therefore the conductivity values reported in scientific literature span from 10^{–5} S/cm up to 10 mS/cm, the highest value close to room temperature reported up to now. Compared to LGP, the room-temperature ionic conductivity of LAGP is increased by 3-4 orders of magnitude upon partial substitution of Ge^{4+} by Al^{3+}. Aluminium ions have a lower charge compared to Ge^{4+} ions and additional lithium is incorporated in the NASICON structure to maintain charge balance, resulting in an enlarged number of charge carriers. The beneficial effect of aluminium is maximized for x around 0.4 - 0.5; for larger Al content, the single-phase NASICON structure is not stable and secondary phases appear, mainly AlPO_{4}, Li_{4}P_{2}O_{7}, and GeO_{2}. Secondary phases are typically nonconductive; however, small and controlled amounts of AlPO_{4} exert a densification effect which affects in a positive way the overall ionic conductivity of the material.

The prefactor σ_{0} in the Arrhenius equation can in turn be written as a function of fundamental constants and conduction parameters:

$\sigma_0=\frac{1}{3}\frac{(Ze)^2}{k_{B}T}nv_0l_0$

where

Z is ion valence,
e is the elementary charge,
T is the absolute temperature,
k_{B} is the Boltzmann constant,
n is the concentration of charge carriers,
v_{0} is the average velocity of the ions,
l_{0} is the mean free path.

The prefactor is directly proportional to the concentration of mobile lithium-ion carriers, which increases with the aluminium content in the material. As a result, since the dependency of the activation energy on aluminium content is negligible, the ionic conductivity is expected to increase with increasing Ge^{4+} substitution by Al^{3+}, until secondary phases are formed. The introduction of aluminium also reduces the grain boundary resistivity of the material, positively impacting on the total (bulk crystal + grain boundary) ionic conductivity of the LAGP material.

As expected for solid ionic conductors, the ionic conductivity of LAGP increases with increasing temperature.

Regarding the electronic conductivity of LAGP, it should be as low as possible to prevent electrical short circuit between anode and cathode. As for ionic conductivity, the exact stoichiometry and microstructure, strongly connected to the synthesis method, have an influence on the electronic conductivity, even if the reported values are very low and close to (or lower than) 10^{–9} S/cm.

=== Thermal properties ===
The specific heat capacity of LAGP materials with general formula Li_{1+x}Al_{x}Ge_{2-x}(PO_{4})_{3} fits into the Maier-Kelley polynomial law in the temperature range from room temperature to 700 °C:

$C_p(T)=A + B\cdot T + C\cdot T^{-2}$

where

T is the absolute temperature,
A, B, C are fitting constants.

Typical values are in the range of 0.75 - 1.5 J⋅g^{−1}⋅K^{−1} in the temperature interval 25 - 100 °C. The A, B constants increase with the x value, i.e. with both the aluminium and the lithium content, while the constant C does not follow a precise trend. As a result, the specific heat capacity of LAGP is expected to increase as the Al content grows and the Ge content decreases, which is consistent with data about the relative specific heats of aluminium and germanium compounds.

In addition, the thermal diffusivity $\alpha$ of LAGP follows a decreasing trend with increasing temperature, irrespective of the aluminium content:

$\alpha\propto T^{-p}$

The aluminium level affects the exponent $p$, which varies from 0.08 (high Al content) to 0.11 (low Al content). Such small values suggest the presence of a large number of point defects in the material, which is highly beneficial for solid ionic conductors. Finally, the expression for the thermal conductivity can be written:

$\kappa = \frac{1}{3} \cdot C_v \cdot v_{ph} \cdot l_{ph} = \alpha \cdot C_p \cdot \rho$

where

C_{v} is the heat capacity per unit volume,
v_{ph} is the average phonon group velocity,
l_{ph} is the phonon mean free path,
$\rho$ is the density of the material.

Taking everything into account, as the aluminium content in LAGP increases, the ionic conductivity increases as well, while the thermal conductivity decreases, since a larger number of lithium ions enhances the phonon scattering, thus reducing the phonon mean free path and the thermal transport in the material. Therefore, thermal and ionic transports in LAGP ceramics are not correlated: the corresponding conductivities follow opposite trends as a function of the aluminium content and are affected in a different way by temperature variations (e.g., the ionic conductivity increases by one order of magnitude upon an increase from room temperature to 100 °C, while the thermal conductivity increases by only 6%).

=== Thermal stability ===
Detrimental secondary phases can also form because of thermal treatments or during the material production. Excessively high sintering/annealing temperatures or long dwelling times will result in the loss of volatile species (especially Li_{2}O) and in the decomposition of LAGP main phase into AlPO_{4} and GeO_{2}. LAGP bulk samples and thin films are typically stable up to 700-750 °C; if this temperature is exceeded, volatile lithium is lost and the impurity phase GeO_{2} forms. If the temperature is further increased beyond 950 °C, also AlPO_{4} appears.

Raman spectroscopy and in situ X-ray diffraction (XRD) are useful techniques that can be employed to recognise the phase purity of LAGP samples during and after the heat treatments.

=== Chemical and electrochemical stability ===
LAGP belongs to phosphate-based solid electrolytes and, in spite of showing a moderate ionic conductivity compared to other families of solid ionic conductors, it possesses some intrinsic advantages with respect to sulfides and oxides:

- Extremely high chemical stability in humid air;
- Wide electrochemical stability window;
- Low to negligible electronic conductivity.

One of the main advantages of LAGP is its chemical stability in the presence of oxygen, water vapour, and carbon dioxide, which simplifies the manufacture process preventing the use of a glovebox or protected environments. Unlike sulfide-based solid electrolytes, which react with water releasing poisonous gaseous hydrogen sulfide, and garnet-type lithium lanthanum zirconium oxide (LLZO), which react with water and CO_{2} to form passivating layers of LiOH and Li_{2}CO_{3}, LAGP is practically inert in humid air.

Another important advantage of LAGP is its wide electrochemical stability window, up to 6 V, which allows the use of such electrolyte in contact with high-voltage cathodes, thus enabling high energy densities. However, the stability at very low voltages and against lithium metal is controversial: even if LAGP is more stable than LATP because of the absence of titanium, some literature works report on the reduction of Ge^{4+} by lithium as well, with formation of Ge^{2+} and metallic germanium at the electrode-electrolyte interface and dramatic increase of interfacial resistance.

The possible decomposition mechanism of LAGP in contact with metallic lithium is reported in the equation below:

2 LiGe_{2}(PO_{4})_{3} + 4 Li → 3 GeO_{2} + 6 LiPO_{3} + Ge

== Synthesis ==
Several synthesis methods exist to produce LAGP in the form of bulk pellets or thin films, depending on the required performances and final applications. The synthesis path significantly affects the microstructure of the LAGP material, which plays a key role in determining its overall conductive properties. Indeed, a compact layer of crystalline LAGP with large and connected grains, and minimal amount of secondary, non-conductive phases ensures the highest conductivity values. On the contrary, an amorphous structure or the presence of small grains and pores tend to hinder the motion of lithium ions, with values of ionic conductivity in the range of 10^{–8} - 10^{–6} S/cm for glassy LAGP.

In most cases, a post-process thermal treatment is performed to achieve the desired degree of crystallinity.

=== Bulk pellets ===
==== Solid-state sintering ====
Solid-state sintering is the most used synthesis process to produce solid-state electrolytes. Powders of LAGP precursors, including oxides like GeO_{2} and Al_{2}O_{3}, are mixed, calcinated and densified at high temperature (700 - 1200 °C) and for long times (12 hours). Sintered LAGP is characterized by high crystalline quality, large grains, a compact microstructure, and high density, even if negative side effects such as loss of volatile lithium compounds and formation of secondary phases should be avoided while the material is kept at high temperature.

The sintering parameters affects LAGP microstructure and purity and, ultimately, its ionic conductivity and conduction performances.

==== Glass crystallization ====
LAGP glass-ceramics can be obtained starting from an amorphous glass with nominal composition of Li_{1.5}Al_{0.5}Ge_{1.5}(PO_{4})_{3}, which is subsequently annealed to promote crystallization. Compared to solid-state sintering, ceramic melt-quenching followed by crystallization is a simpler and more flexible process which leads to a denser and more homogeneous microstructure.

The starting point for glass crystallization is the synthesis of the glass through a melt-quenching process of precursors in suitable amount to achieve the desired stoichiometry. Different precursors can be used, especially to provide phosphorus to the material. One possible route is the following:

- Preheating of Al_{2}O_{3} and GeO_{2} at 1000 °C for 1 hour;
- Drying of Li_{2}CO_{3} at 300 °C for 3 hours;
- Mixing of the starting precursors in proper amounts to match the nominal stoichiometry;
- Removal of volatile species by stepwise heating of the mix to 500 °C;
- Melting at 1450 °C for 1 hour;
- Quenching of the melt;
- Annealing of glass samples in air.

The main steps are summarized in the following equation:

3/4 Li_{2}CO_{3} + 3/2 GeO_{2} + 3 NH_{4}H_{2}PO_{4} + 1/4 Al_{2}O_{3} → Li_{1.5}Al_{0.5}Ge_{1.5}(PO_{4})_{3} + 3 NH_{3} + 3/4 CO_{2} + 9/2 H_{2}O

The annealing temperature is selected to promote the full crystallization and avoiding the formation of detrimental secondary phases, pores, and cracks. Various temperatures are reported in different literature sources; however, crystallization does not usually start below 550-600 °C, while temperatures larger than 850 °C cause the extensive formation of impurity phases.

==== Sol-gel techniques ====
The sol-gel technique enables the production of LAGP particles at lower processing temperatures compared to sintering or glass crystallization. The typical precursor is a germanium organic compound, like germanium ethoxide Ge(OC_{2}H_{5}), which is dissolved in an aqueous solution with stoichiometric amounts of the sources of lithium, phosphorus, and aluminium. The mixture is then heated and stirred. The sol-gel process starts after the addition of a gelation agent and the final material is obtained after subsequent heating steps aimed at eliminating water and at promoting the pyrolysis reaction, followed by calcination.

The sol-gel process requires the use of germanium organic precursors, which are more expensive compared to GeO_{2}.

=== Thin films ===
==== Sputtering ====
Sputtering (in particular radio-frequency magnetron sputtering) has been applied to the fabrication of LAGP thin-films starting from a LAGP target. Depending on the temperature of the substrate during the deposition, LAGP can be deposited in the cold sputtering or hot sputtering configuration.

The film stoichiometry and microstructure can be tuned by controlling the deposition parameters, especially the power density, the chamber pressure, and the substrate temperature. Both amorphous and crystalline films are obtained, with a typical thickness around 1 μm. The room-temperature ionic conductivity and the activation energy of sputtered and annealed LAGP films are comparable with those of bulk pellets, i.e. 10^{–4} S/cm and 0.31 eV.

==== Aerosol deposition ====
Pre-synthesized LAGP powders can be sprayed on a substrate to form a LAGP film by means of aerosol deposition. The powders are loaded into the aerosol deposition chamber and purified air is used as the carrier gas to drive the particles towards the substrate, where they impinge and coalesce to generate the film. Since the as-produced film is amorphous, an annealing treatment is usually performed to improve the film crystallinity and its conduction properties.

=== Other techniques ===
Some other methods to produce LAGP materials have been reported in literature works, including liquid-based techniques, spark plasma sintering, and co-precipitation.

In the following table, some ionic conductivity values are reported for LAGP materials produced with different synthesis routes, in the case of optimized production and annealing conditions.

LAGP total ionic conductivity depending on the synthesis method
Synthesis method	Room-temperature total ionic conductivity
Solid-state sintering	2 × 10^{–4} S/cm
Glass crystallization	3.9 × 10^{–4} S/cm
Sol-gel technique	1.8 × 10^{–4} S/cm
Hot sputtering	1.48 × 10^{–4} S/cm
Cold sputtering	1.24 × 10^{–4} S/cm
Aerosol deposition	1.16 × 10^{–4} S/cm
Spark plasma sintering	3.29 × 10^{–4} S/cm
Co-precipitation method	7.8 × 10^{–5} S/cm

== Applications ==
LAGP is one of the most studied solid-state electrolytes for lithium-ion batteries. The use of a solid-state electrolyte improves the battery safety eliminating liquid-based electrolytes, which are flammable and usually unstable above 4.3 V. In addition, it physically separates the anode from the cathode, reducing the risk of short-circuit, and strongly inhibits lithium dendrite growth. Finally, solid-state electrolytes can operate in a wide range of temperatures, with minimum conductivity loss and decomposition issues. Nevertheless, the ionic conductivity of solid-state electrolytes is some orders of magnitude lower than the one of conventional liquid-based electrolytes, therefore a thin electrolyte layer is preferred to reduce the overall internal impedance and to achieve a shorter diffusion path and larger energy densities. Therefore, LAGP is a suitable candidate for all-solid-state thin-film lithium-ion batteries, in which the electrolyte thickness ranges from 1 to some hundreds of micrometres. The good mechanical strength of LAGP effectively suppress lithium dendrites during lithium stripping and plating, reducing the risk of internal short-circuit and battery failure.

LAGP is applied as a solid-state electrolyte both as a pure material and as a component in organic-inorganic composite electrolytes. For example, LAGP can be composited with polymeric materials, like polypropylene (PP) or polyethylene oxide (PEO), to improve the ionic conductivity and to tune the electrochemical stability. Moreover, since LAGP is not fully stable against metallic lithium because of the electrochemical reactivity of Ge^{4+} cations, additional interlayers can be introduced between the lithium anode and the solid electrolyte to improve the interfacial stability. The addition of a thin layer of metallic germanium inhibits the electrochemical reduction by lithium metal at very negative potentials and promotes the interfacial contact between the anode and the electrolyte, resulting in improved cycling performance and battery stability. The use of polymer-ceramic composite interlayers or the excess of Li_{2}O are alternative strategies to improve the electrochemical stability of LAGP at negative potentials.

LAGP has been also tested not only as a solid electrolyte, but also as an anode material in lithium-ion battery, showing high electrochemical stability and good cycling performance.

=== Lithium-sulfur batteries ===
LAGP-based membranes have been applied as separators in lithium-sulfur batteries. LAGP allows the transfer of lithium ions from anode to cathode but, at the same time, prevents the diffusion of polysulfides from the cathode, suppressing the polysulfide shuttle effect and enhancing the overall performance of the battery. Typically, all-solid-state lithium-sulfur batteries are not fabricated because of high interfacial resistance; therefore, hybrid electrolytes are usually realized, in which LAGP acts as a barrier against polysulfide diffusion but it is combined with liquid or polymer electrolytes to promote fast lithium diffusion and to improve the interfacial contact with electrodes.

== See also ==
- Solid-state electrolyte
- Solid-state battery
- NASICON
- Lithium lanthanum zirconium oxide
