= NASICON =

Class of solid materials

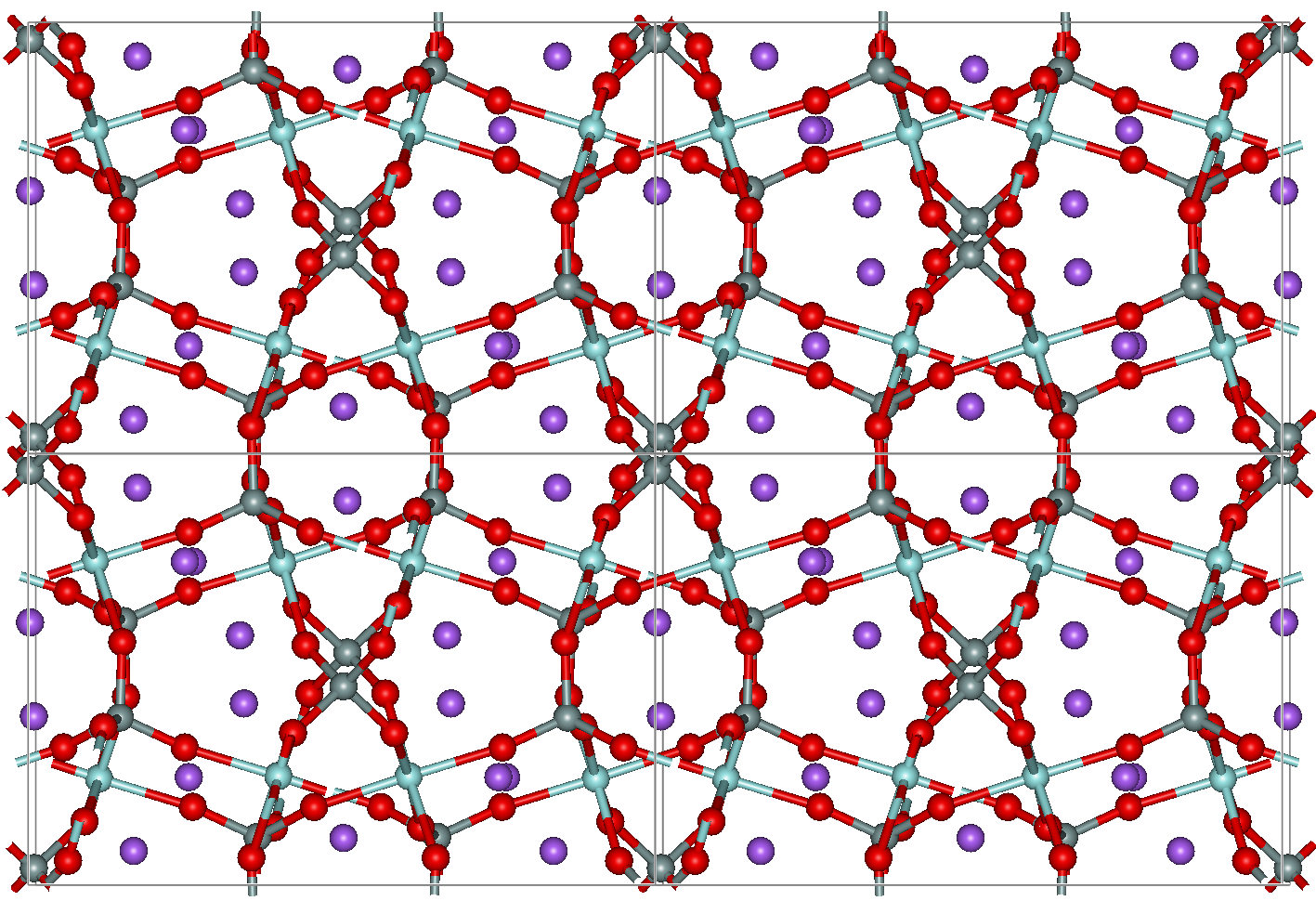
2×2 unit cell of Na_{3}Zr_{2}(SiO_{4})_{2}(PO_{4}) (x = 2), which is the most common NASICON material; red: O, purple: Na, light green: Zr, dark green: sites shared by Si and P

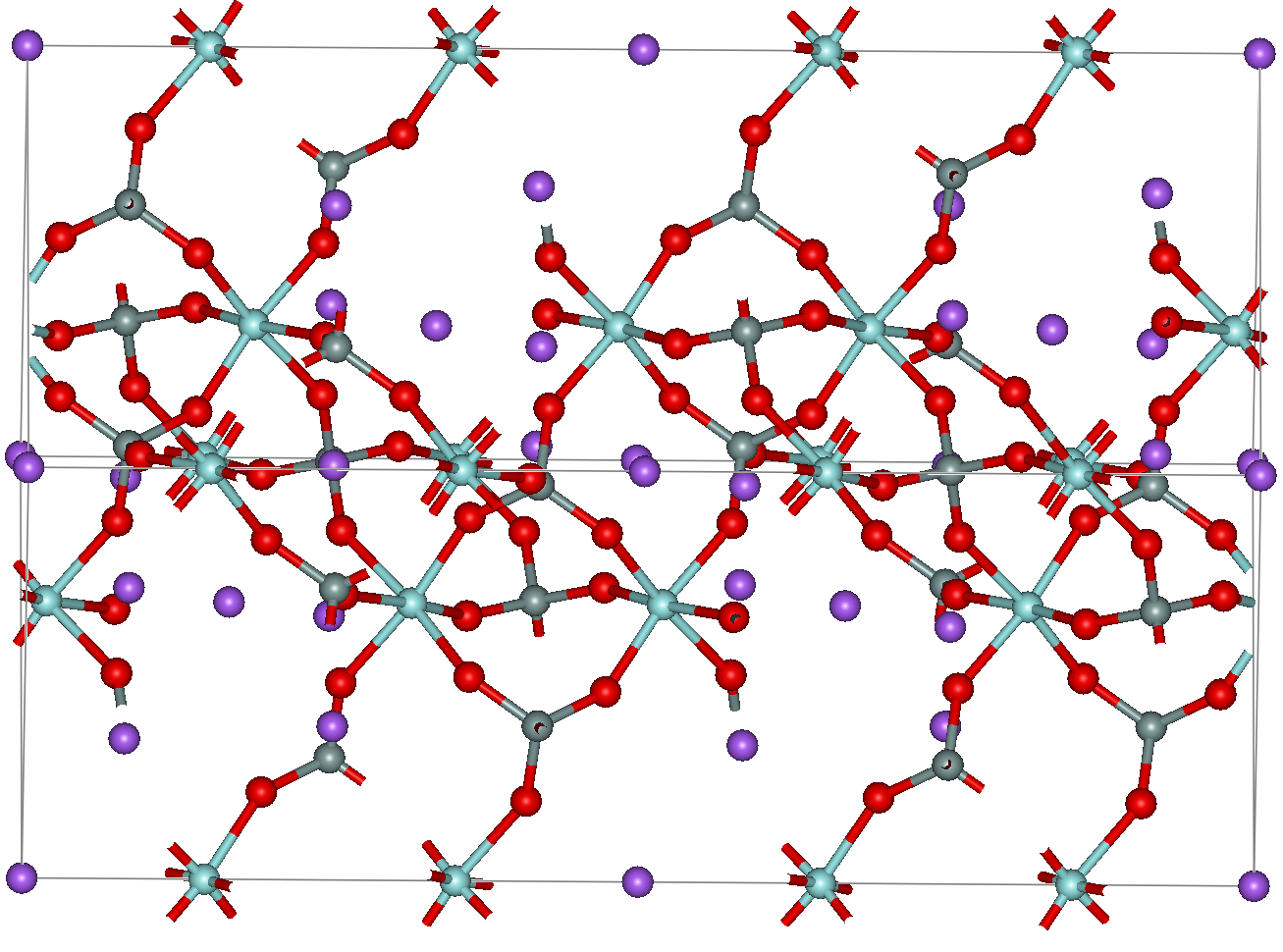
One unit cell of Na_{2}Zr_{2}(SiO_{4})(PO_{4})_{2} (x = 1); red: O, purple: Na, light green: Zr, dark green: sites shared by Si and P

NASICON is an acronym for sodium (Na) super ionic conductor, which usually refers to a family of solids with the chemical formula Na_{1+x}Zr_{2}Si_{x}P_{3−x}O_{12}, 0 < x < 3. In a broader sense, it is also used for similar compounds where Na, Zr and/or Si are replaced by isovalent elements. NASICON compounds have high ionic conductivities, on the order of 10^{−3} S/cm, which rival those of liquid electrolytes. They are caused by hopping of Na ions among interstitial sites of the NASICON crystal lattice.

== Properties ==
The crystal structure of NASICON compounds was characterized in 1968. It is a covalent network consisting of ZrO_{6} octahedra and PO_{4}/SiO_{4} tetrahedra that share common corners. Sodium ions are located at two types of interstitial positions. They move among those sites through bottlenecks, whose size, and thus the NASICON electrical conductivity, depends on the NASICON composition, on the site occupancy, and on the oxygen content in the surrounding atmosphere. The conductivity decreases for x < 2 or when all Si is substituted for P in the crystal lattice (and vice versa); it can be increased by adding a rare-earth compound to NASICON, such as yttria.

NASICON materials can be prepared as single crystals, polycrystalline ceramic compacts, thin films or as a bulk glass called NASIGLAS. Most of them, except NASIGLAS and phosphorus-free Na_{4}Zr_{2}Si_{3}O_{12}, react with molten sodium at 300 °C, and therefore are unsuitable for electric batteries that use sodium as an electrode. However, a NASICON membrane is being considered for a sodium-sulfur battery where the sodium stays solid.

== Development and potential applications ==
The main application envisaged for NASICON materials is as the solid electrolyte in a sodium-ion battery. Some NASICONs exhibit a low thermal expansion coefficient (< 10^{−6} K^{−1}), which is useful for precision instruments and household ovenware. NASICONs can be doped with rare-earth elements, such as Eu, and used as phosphors. Their electrical conductivity is sensitive to molecules in the ambient atmosphere, a phenomenon that can be used to detect CO_{2}, SO_{2}, NO, NO_{2}, NH_{3} and H_{2}S gases. Other NASICON applications include catalysis, immobilization of radioactive waste, and sodium removal from water.

The development of sodium-ion batteries is important since it makes use of an earth-abundant material and can serve as an alternative to lithium-ion batteries which are experiencing ever-increasing demand despite the limited availability of lithium. Developing high-performance sodium-ion batteries is a challenge because it is necessary to develop electrodes that meet the requirements of high-energy density and high cycling stability while also being cost-efficient. NASICON-based electrode materials are known for their wide range of electrochemical potentials, high ionic conductivity, and most importantly their structural and thermal stabilities. NASICON-type cathode materials for sodium-ion batteries have a mechanically robust three-dimensional (3D) framework with open channels that endow it with the capability for fast ionic diffusion. A strong and lasting structural framework allows for repeated Na^{+} ion de-/insertions with relatively high operating potentials. Its high safety, high potential, and low volume change make NASICON a promising candidate for sodium-ion battery cathodes.

NASICON cathodes typically suffer from poor electrical conductivity and low specific capacity which severely limits their practical applications. Efforts to enhance the movement of electrons, or electrical conductivity, include particle downsizing and carbon-coating which have both been reported to improve the electrochemical performance.

It is important to consider the relationship between lattice parameters and activation energy as the change in lattice size has a direct influence on the size of the pathway for Na^{+} conduction as well as the hopping distance of the Na^{+} ions to the next vacancy. A large hopping distance requires a high activation energy.

NASICON-phosphate Na_{3}V_{2}(PO_{4})_{3} compounds are considered promising cathodes with a theoretical specific energy of 400 W h kg^{−1}. Vanadium-based compounds exhibit satisfactory high energy densities that are comparable to those of lithium-ion batteries as they operate through multi-electron redox reactions (V3+/V4+ and V4+/V5+) and a high operating voltage. The use of vanadium is toxic and expensive which introduces a critical issue in real applications. This concern holds true for other electrodes based on costly 3d transition metal elements such as Ni- or Co-based electrodes. The most abundant and non-toxic 3d element, iron, is the favored choice as the redox center in the polyanionic or mixed-polyanion system.

== Lithium analogues ==
Some lithium phosphates also possess the NASICON structure and can be considered as the direct analogues of the sodium-based NASICONs. The general formula of such compounds is LiM_{2}(PO_{4})_{3}, where M identifies an element like titanium, germanium, zirconium, hafnium, or tin. Similarly to sodium-based NASICONs, lithium-based NASICONs consist of a network of MO_{6} octahedra connected by PO_{4} tetrahedra, with lithium ions occupying the interstitial sites among them. Ionic conduction is ensured by lithium hopping among adjacent interstitial sites.

Lithium NASICONs are promising materials to be used as solid electrolytes in all-solid-state lithium-ion batteries.

=== Relevant examples ===
The most investigated lithium-based NASICON materials are LiZr_{2}(PO_{4})_{3}, LiTi_{2}(PO_{4})_{3}, and LiGe_{2}(PO_{4})_{3}.

==== Lithium zirconium phosphate ====
Lithium zirconium phosphate, identified by the formula LiZr_{2}(PO_{4})_{3} (LZP), has been extensively studied because of its polymorphism and interesting conduction properties. At room temperature, LZP has a triclinic crystal structure (C1̅) and undergoes a phase transition to rhombohedral crystal structure (R3̅c) between 25 and 60 °C. The rhombohedral phase is characterized by higher values of ionic conductivity (8×10^{−6} S/cm at 150 °C) compared to the triclinic phase (≈ 8×10^{−9} S/cm at room temperature): such difference may be ascribed to the peculiar distorted tetrahedral coordination of lithium ions in the rhombohedral phase, along with the large number of available empty sites.

The ionic conductivity of LZP can be enhanced by elemental doping, for example replacing some of the zirconium cations with lanthanum, titanium, or aluminium atoms. In case of lanthanum doping, the room-temperature ionic conductivity of the material approaches 7.2×10^{−5} S/cm.

==== Lithium titanium phosphate ====
Lithium titanium phosphate, with general formula LiTi_{2}(PO_{4})_{3} (LTP or LTPO), is another lithium-containing NASICON material in which TiO_{6} octahedra and PO_{4} tetrahedra are arranged in a rhombohedral unit cell. The LTP crystal structure is stable down to 100 K and is characterized by a small coefficient of thermal expansion. LTP shows low ionic conductivity at room temperature, around 10^{−6} S/cm; however, it can be effectively increased by elemental substitution with isovalent or aliovalent elements (Al, Cr, Ga, Fe, Sc, In, Lu, Y, La). The most common derivative of LTP is lithium aluminium titanium phosphate (LATP), whose general formula is Li_{1+x}Al_{x}Ti_{2-x}(PO_{4})_{3}. Ionic conductivity values as high as 1.9×10^{−3} S/cm can be achieved when the microstructure and the aluminium content (x = 0.3 - 0.5) are optimized. The increase of conductivity is attributed to the larger number of mobile lithium ions necessary to balance the extra electrical charge after Ti^{4+} replacement by Al^{3+}, together with a contraction of the c axis of the LATP unit cell.

In spite of attractive conduction properties, LATP is highly unstable in contact with lithium metal, with formation of a lithium-rich phase at the interface and with reduction of Ti^{4+} to Ti^{3+}. Reduction of tetravalent titanium ions proceeds along a single-electron transfer reaction:

$\ce{LiTi2(PO4)3 + Li -> Li2Ti2(PO4)3}$

Both phenomena are responsible for a significant increase of the electronic conductivity of the LATP material (from 3×10^{−9} S/cm to 2.9×10^{−6} S/cm), leading to the degradation of the material and to the ultimate cell failure if LATP is used as a solid electrolyte in a lithium-ion battery with metallic lithium as the anode.

==== Lithium germanium phosphate ====
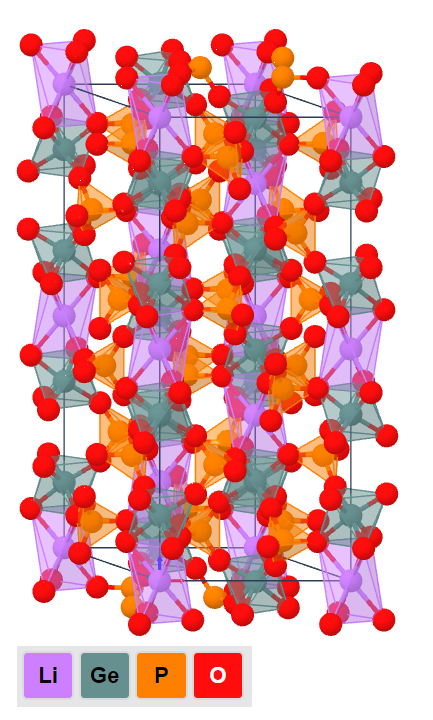
LGP crystal structure.

Lithium germanium phosphate, LiGe_{2}(PO_{4})_{3} (LGP), is closely similar to LTP, except for the presence of GeO_{6} octahedra instead of TiO_{6} octahedra in the rhombohedral unit cell. Similarly to LTP, the ionic conductivity of pure LGP is low and can be improved by doping the material with aliovalent elements like aluminium, resulting in lithium aluminium germanium phosphate (LAGP), Li_{1+x}Al_{x}Ge_{2-x}(PO_{4})_{3}. Contrary to LGP, the room-temperature ionic conductivity of LAGP spans from 10^{−5} S/cm up to 10^{−3} S/cm, depending on the microstructure and on the aluminium content, with an optimal composition for x ≈ 0.5. In both LATP and LAGP, non-conductive secondary phases are expected for larger aluminium content (x > 0.5 - 0.6).

LAGP is more stable than LATP against lithium metal anode, since the reduction reaction of Ge^{4+} cations is a 4-electron reaction and has a high kinetic barrier:

$\ce{2LiGe2(PO4)3 + 4Li -> 3GeO2 + 6LiPO3 + Ge}$

However, the stability of the lithium anode-LAGP interface is still not fully clarified and the formation of detrimental interlayers with subsequent battery failure has been reported.

=== Application in lithium-ion batteries ===
Phosphate-based materials with a NASICON crystal structure, especially LATP and LAGP, are good candidates as solid-state electrolytes in lithium-ion batteries, even if their average ionic conductivity (≈10^{−5} - 10^{−4} S/cm) is lower compared to other classes of solid electrolytes like garnets and sulfides. However, the use of LATP and LAGP provides some advantages:

- Excellent stability in humid air and against CO_{2}, with no release of harmful gases or formation of Li_{2}CO_{3} passivating layer;
- High stability against water;
- Wide electrochemical stability window and high voltage stability, up to 6 V in the case of LAGP, enabling the use of high-voltage cathodes;
- Low toxicity compared to sulfide-based solid electrolytes;
- Low cost and easy preparation.

A high-capacity lithium metal anode could not be coupled with a LATP solid electrolyte, because of Ti^{4+} reduction and fast electrolyte decomposition; on the other hand, the reactivity of LAGP in contact with lithium at very negative potentials is still debated, but protective interlayers could be added to improve the interfacial stability.

Considering LZP, it is predicted to be electrochemically stable in contact with metallic lithium; the main limitation arises from the low ionic conductivity of the room-temperature triclinic phase. Proper elemental doping is an effective route to both stabilize the rhombohedral phase below 50 °C and improve the ionic conductivity.

== See also ==
- Lithium aluminium germanium phosphate
- LISICON
- Solid-state electrolyte
- Sodium-ion battery
- Lithium-ion battery
