= Energy materials =

Energy materials are functional materials designed and processed for energy harvesting, storage, and conversion in modern technologies. This field merges materials science, electrochemistry, and condensed matter physics to design materials with tailored electronic/ionic transport, catalytic activity, and microstructural control for applications including batteries, fuel cells, solar cells, and thermoelectrics.

== Definition and scope ==
Energy materials are characterized by their ability to:

Control charge carrier flow (electrons/ions)

Facilitate redox reactions at interfaces

Optimize energy density and power density

Withstand electrochemical degradation Their study spans atomic-scale crystal structure design to macroscopic granular architectures, enabling technologies critical to renewable energy transitions and electrified infrastructure.

== Fundamental properties and phenomena ==
Key scientific aspects justifying specialized study:

=== Mixed ionic-electronic conductivity (MIEC) ===
Materials like perovskites (e.g., LSGM) exhibit dual ionic/electronic conduction, essential for solid oxide fuel cell electrodes and solid-state batteries. Charge transport mechanisms involve hopping conduction, defect chemistry, and grain boundary effects.

=== Electrochemical performance metrics ===
Critical parameters include:

Faradaic efficiency in electrolysis

Cycle life in batteries

Fill factor in photovoltaics These depend on electrode kinetics, electrolyte stability, and interfacial phenomena like the solid-electrolyte interphase.

=== Microstructure-property relationships ===
Granular or nanostructured morphologies (e.g., porous electrodes) enhance surface area and diffusion pathways. Controlled porosity and grain boundary engineering optimize mass transport while mitigating mechanical stress.

== Material classes by function ==
Classification of Energy Materials by Primary Function
Function	Material Classes	Key Properties	Representative Applications
Energy harvesting	• Semiconductors (Si, GaAs) • Hybrid perovskites • Thermoelectric materials (Bi₂Te₃, PbTe) • Piezoelectrics (PZT, ZnO)	• Optimal bandgap • High carrier mobility • Seebeck coefficient • Piezoelectric coefficient	• Photovoltaics • Thermoelectric generators • Piezoelectric sensors
Energy storage	• Battery materials (LiCoO₂, graphite) • Electrode materials (activated carbon) • Hydrogen storage materials (MOFs, metal hydrides)	• High energy density • Cycle life stability • Fast ion diffusion • Electrical double-layer capacitance	• Lithium-ion battery • Supercapacitor • H₂ storage systems
Energy conversion	• Electrocatalysts (Pt/C, perovskites) • Electrolytes (YSZ, Nafion) • Thermionic materials	• High catalytic activity • Ionic conductivity • Thermal stability • Exchange current density	• Fuel cell • Water electrolyzer • Thermionic converter

== Interdisciplinary foundations ==
The field integrates:

Chemistry: Electrocatalyst design, polymer chemistry for ionomer membranes

Physics: Band theory for semiconductors, quantum dot phenomena

Engineering: Mass transport optimization, thermal management

Biology: Bio-inspired catalysts, enzymatic fuel cells

== Research challenges ==
The field of energy materials faces several critical research frontiers that must be addressed to enable widespread deployment of sustainable energy technologies. These challenges span fundamental materials science, engineering scalability, and environmental sustainability considerations.

=== Materials substitution and resource security ===
A primary challenge involves developing alternatives to scarce or geopolitically sensitive materials. The development of cobalt-free batteries addresses both supply chain vulnerabilities and ethical concerns related to cobalt mining, particularly in the Democratic Republic of the Congo. Similarly, creating PGM-free catalysts for fuel cells and electrolyzers is essential for reducing costs and dependence on rare platinum group metals. Research focuses on transition metal complexes, metal-organic frameworks (MOFs), and single-atom catalysts as potential alternatives.

=== Solid-state energy storage ===
Solid-state battery technology represents a major advancement opportunity, offering improved safety and energy density compared to conventional liquid electrolyte systems. However, enhancing ionic conductivity in solid electrolytes remains a significant challenge. Key research areas include developing superionic conductors, understanding grain boundary effects, and engineering interfacial properties between electrodes and solid electrolytes. Materials such as sulfide electrolytes, oxide electrolytes, and polymer electrolytes are being investigated to achieve the conductivity levels required for practical applications.

=== Durability and degradation mechanisms ===
Understanding and mitigating electrode degradation mechanisms is crucial for extending the operational lifetime of energy storage and conversion devices. Research focuses on identifying failure modes including capacity fade, impedance growth, and structural degradation in battery materials. For fuel cells, catalyst degradation through dissolution, sintering, and carbon corrosion represents major challenges. Advanced characterization techniques such as operando spectroscopy and transmission electron microscopy are employed to study these mechanisms in real-time.

=== Emerging photovoltaic technologies ===
Scaling perovskite photovoltaics from laboratory to commercial deployment faces significant stability challenges. Perovskite materials are susceptible to degradation from moisture, oxygen, heat, and ultraviolet radiation. Research efforts focus on developing encapsulation strategies, compositional engineering through mixed cation and mixed halide perovskites, and interface engineering to improve long-term stability while maintaining high power conversion efficiency.

=== Circular economy integration ===
Designing circular economy-compatible recycling processes for energy materials is essential for sustainable deployment at scale. This involves developing hydrometallurgical and pyrometallurgical processes for recovering valuable materials from end-of-life batteries, as well as designing materials for disassembly and reuse. Research also focuses on life cycle assessment methodologies to evaluate the environmental impact of different recycling approaches and material choices.

=== Cross-cutting challenges ===
Several challenges span multiple material classes and applications:

Multiscale modeling: Developing computational materials science approaches that link atomic-scale properties to device-level performance High-throughput screening: Implementing materials informatics and machine learning to accelerate materials discovery Manufacturing scalability: Translating laboratory synthesis methods to industrial-scale production while maintaining material properties Standardization: Establishing consistent testing protocols and performance metrics across different energy material applications

== See also ==
Energy density • Power density • Electrochemical cell

Nanomaterials • Ceramic engineering • Thin film

Sustainable energy • Energy transition
