= D33 =

D33, D.33 or D-33 may refer to:

== Ships ==
- Almirante Garcia, an Almirante Clemente-class destroyer of the Venezuelan Navy
- Brazilian destroyer Maranhao (D33), a Fletcher-class destroyer of the Brazilian Navy
- HMAS Canberra (D33), a County-class heavy cruiser of the Royal Australian Navy
- HMS Dauntless (D33), a D-class destroyer of the Royal Navy

== Other uses ==
- Akaflieg Darmstadt D-33, a German experimental glider
- D33 road (Croatia)
- Dewoitine D.33, a French single-engined monoplane
- LNER Class D33, a class of British steam locomotives
- d_{33}, the piezoelectric coefficient
- Tarrasch Defense, a chess opening
