= Polymer solution casting =

The polymer solution casting process utilizes a mandrel, or inner diameter mold, that is immersed in a tank of polymer solution or liquid plastic that has been specifically engineered for the process. Due to a combination of thermal and frictional properties, the polymer solution then forms a thin film around the mold. The mold is then extracted from the tank in a precisely controlled manner, followed by a curing or drying process. Once the first layer of thin film is appropriately solidified, secondary features can be added to the product such as braided or coiled wire, laser-cut hypotubes or engineered metal reinforcements to prevent kinking, or imaging targets specific to the intended medical application. Multiple casting steps can then be repeated to encapsulate the reinforcements, build up wall thickness, add additional lumens and optimize column strength. The part is then removed from the mold after it is cured or solidified.

The most notable attribute of this thin-film process technology is the ability to alternate the material properties (i.e. strength, durometer, color, lubricity) amongst the individual layers or even down the length of the part, resulting in a feature-rich single-piece construction. This process also allows other components to be incorporated into the structure of the part during the layering processes, such as injection molded components and extruded tubes made of high performance polymers such as PTFE, PEBAX, and polyimide.

Another notable advantage of polymer solution casting technology is that the total manufacturing cost for both prototyping and production volumes are frequently less than the conventional technologies. This cost benefit results from the use of inexpensive molds coupled with the scalability and adaptability of the manufacturing line. As a result, new products and processes are readily developed and implemented, facilitating cost-effective creation of very feature rich and complex catheters. Since the 1990s, Avalon Laboratories and Piper Plastics Corp. have aggressively pioneered polymer solution casting technology, focusing on complex medical devices. The history of these technologies dates back to many highly regarded names in the medical industry including Medtronic, BioMedicus, Bard, Terumo, Research Medical Inc., Shiley, Polaris Plastics, and Caplugs.

== Materials ==
Polymer solution casting technology can be deployed utilizing a host of different polymer materials depending on the application and design inputs, including those used in Class I, II and III medical devices, and for the preparation of polymer electrolytes. The earliest and most commonly found materials were polyvinyl chlorides (PVC) due to their advantages in cost, physical properties and clarity. Over the past twenty years, there has been scrutiny of the long term health effects of the PVC base materials relating to the plasticizers and stabilizers which are needed to ensure adequate shelf life of sterilized product. More recently, newly engineered formulations have eliminated these biocompatibility concerns while extending the shelf life, and PVC has re-emerged as a preferred polymer for use in interventional and surgical applications.

Polyurethane has emerged as another polymer that meets the medical device market's demands for thinner wall sections, longer lengths and extended blood exposure. The high strength and range of properties make these materials an excellent choice for soft elastomer applications. Among the first commercial polyurethane medical products were non-allergenic medical gloves, developed as a response to latex allergies. These advanced polymers offer a full range of physical properties, improved biocompatibility, and lubricous properties by way of custom formulations and coatings.

Another material choice for polymer solution casting is silicone urethane copolymers, which are among the most biocompatible synthetic materials. This class of medical grade material was developed for long-term implantable device applications and offers the physical characteristics of high elongation, low modulus of elasticity, excellent recovery, and resistance to chemicals, oil, and UV light.

While there exists a number of materials to choose from while deploying polymer solution casting technology, the material science work continues in the areas of wall thickness, strength, lubricity, biocompatibility and clarity as well as interactions of the liquid polymers with extruded and injection molded components.

== Medical device applications ==
- Cardiovascular
- Neurovascular
- Peripheral Vascular
- Interventional Cardiology
- Urology
- Oncology
- Ear Nose Throat
- Gastro-intestinal
- Gynecology
- Diabetes
- Radiology
- Venous disease
- Microbiology
- Ophthalmic
- Interventional pulmonology
- Orthopedics
- Percutaneous Valve Therapy
- Structural Heart therapy
