= Jong-Soo Rhyee =

South Korean physicist

- Education: BS in Physics; MS in Physics; PhD in Materials Science (Magnetic materials)
- Alma mater: Chung-buk National University (CBNU); Pohang University of Science and Technology (POSTECH); Gwang-Ju Institute of Science and Technology (GIST)
- Scientific career
- Workplaces: Kyung Hee University; V-memory; R-Materials
- Thesis: Magnetic and electronic properties of Hexaboride compounds (R_{1−x}R*_{x}B_{6}/R, R* = Ca, La and Eu)

Jong-Soo Rhyee is a South Korean physicist and materials scientist. He is a professor in the Department of Applied Physics at the Applied Science College of Kyung Hee University and serves as the Outside Director at KPT, the Representative CEO of V-memory, and the CTO of R-Materials in South Korea.

Rhyee's research spans across domains of material science, encompassing magnetic and energy materials, crystal growth, thermoelectric materials, high thermal conductivity materials, magneto-caloric effect materials, unconventional properties of oxides and intermetallics, and superconductivity. He is the recipient of the 2009 Young Investigator Award by the International Thermoelectric Society and the 2018 IAAM Scientist Medal by the International Association of Advanced Materials.

Rhyee holds 19 Korean patents along with 32 international patents.

== Education and early career ==
Rhyee obtained his Bachelor's in Physics from Chung-buk National University in 1998, and a Master's in Experimental Solid-State Physics from Pohang University of Science and Technology (POSTECH) in 2000 under advisor Sung Ik Lee. He pursued a Ph.D. in Magnetic Materials at Gwangju Institute of Science and Technology (GIST) from 2000 to 2005, researching Hexaboride compounds under advisor Beong Ki Cho.

== Career ==
Rhyee worked as a Postdoc Researcher in the Crystal Growth group at Max Planck Institute for Solid State Research in Germany from April 2006 to April 2007 and then served as an R&D Staff Researcher at the Materials Research Lab at Samsung Advanced Institute of Technology (SAIT) from May 2007 to August 2010. He moved into academia as an assistant professor at the Department of Applied Physics of the Applied Science College at Kyung Hee University in South Korea in 2010, becoming associate professor in 2014 and Professor in 2019

While in the role of associate professor, Rhyee concurrently held the position of department chair for the Department of Applied Physics from March 2017 to February 2019, and as the Vice Dean of the Applied Science College at Kyung Hee University from March 2018 to February 2019. He has been serving as the Outside Director at KPT since June 2022, as well as the CTO at R-Materials in South Korea since January 2023, and has also been acting as the Representative CEO of V-memory in South Korea since January 2020.

== Research ==
Rhyee's research has focused on developing new materials in fields such as magnetic, superconductivity, and energy materials. He has investigated crystal growth in intermetallic and oxide compounds, studied thermoelectric materials for waste heat recovery and high thermal conductive materials for electronic applications. Additionally, his research has encompassed magneto-caloric effect materials for solid-state cooling, unconventional properties of oxides and intermetallics, and quasi-one-dimensional electronic transport. He has also explored soft magnetic materials, topological and Weyl semimetallic system, and superconductivity.

=== Magnetism and thermoelectric research ===
During his time at SAIT's Materials Research Center, Rhyee developed high-performance thermoelectric materials In_{4}Se_{3−δ}, published in Nature on 2009. This research proposed an approach to enhance ZT thermoelectric materials through Peierls distortion. He provided both experimental evidence and theoretical insights demonstrating that alloying SnTe with Ca significantly improved its transport properties, leading to a ZT of 1.35 at 873 K, the highest reported ZT value for singly doped SnTe materials. The study predicted approximately 10% efficiency for high-temperature thermoelectric power generation using SnTe-based materials, assuming a 400 K temperature difference. Furthermore, his work enhanced the thermoelectric properties of In_{4}Se_{3–x}Cl_{0.03} bulk crystals through Ca alloying, and showed that intercalation of Cu nanoparticles between Te layers in Bi_{2}Te_{3} transforms its native p-type character to n-type, reducing thermal conductivity and enhancing thermoelectric performance with a figure of merit (ZT) of 1.15 at approximately 300 K. His research also addressed the development of high-mobility transistors using CVD-grown MoSe_{2} films for applications like high-resolution displays.

Within his magnetism and thermoelectric research, Rhyee has explored unconventional magnetism in boride and intermetallic compounds, with a focus on magnetic polaronic transport and correlated properties. He examined the link between topological states and thermoelectricity, discovering that the topological phase transition in Dirac semimetals boosts thermoelectric performance. Further investigations revealed that selective charge Anderson localization is a novel avenue for enhancing thermoelectricity, yielding a ZT value of 2.0 in n-type thermoelectric power generation. In a collaborative work, he presented a novel magnetic field-induced type II Weyl semimetallic state in the Shastry-Sutherland lattice, characterized by non-trivial Berry phase, magnetic field-induced Weyl nodes and spin chirality, chiral anomaly, anomalous magnetoconductivity, and demonstrated topological phase evolution.

== Awards and honors ==
- 2009 – Young Investigator Award, by International Thermoelectric Society
- 2018 – IAAM Scientist Medal, International Association of Advanced Materials

== Selected articles ==
- Rhyee, Jong-Soo; Lee, Kyu Hyoung; Lee, Sang Mock; Cho, Eunseog; Kim, Sang Il; Lee, Eunsung; Kwon, Yong Seung; Shim, Ji Hoon; Kotliar, Gabriel (June 2009). "Peierls distortion as a route to high thermoelectric performance in In4Se3-δ crystals". Nature. 459 (7249): 965–968. doi:10.1038/nature08088. PMID 19536260.
- Rhyee, Jong-Soo; Ahn, Kyunghan; Lee, Kyu Hyoung; Ji, Hyo Seok; Shim, Ji-Hoon (17 May 2011). "Enhancement of the Thermoelectric Figure-of-Merit in a Wide Temperature Range in In 4 Se 3– x Cl 0.03 Bulk Crystals". Advanced Materials. 23 (19): 2191–2194. Bibcode:2011AdM....23.2191R. doi:10.1002/adma.201004739. PMID 21469219.
- Han, Mi-Kyung; Ahn, Kyunghan; Kim, HeeJin; Rhyee, Jong-Soo; Kim, Sung-Jin (2011). "Formation of Cu nanoparticles in layered Bi2Te3 and their effect on ZT enhancement". Journal of Materials Chemistry. 21 (30): 11365. doi:10.1039/C1JM10163C.
- Al Rahal Al Orabi, Rabih; Mecholsky, Nicolas A.; Hwang, Junphil; Kim, Woochul; Rhyee, Jong-Soo; Wee, Daehyun; Fornari, Marco (12 January 2016). "Band Degeneracy, Low Thermal Conductivity, and High Thermoelectric Figure of Merit in SnTe–CaTe Alloys". Chemistry of Materials. 28 (1): 376–384. doi:10.1021/acs.chemmater.5b04365.
- Rhyee, Jong-Soo; Kwon, Junyeon; Dak, Piyush; Kim, Jin Hee; Kim, Seung Min; Park, Jozeph; Hong, Young Ki; Song, Won Geun; Omkaram, Inturu; Alam, Muhammad A.; Kim, Sunkook (March 2016). "High-Mobility Transistors Based on Large-Area and Highly Crystalline CVD-Grown MoSe 2 Films on Insulating Substrates". Advanced Materials. 28 (12): 2316–2321. Bibcode:2016AdM....28.2316R. doi:10.1002/adma.201504789. PMID 26755196.
