= Sulfur selenium battery =

Lithium rechargeable battery

A sulfur selenium battery is a proposed alternative to lithium-ion batteries that in prototype has an energy density of 500 watt-hours/kg. It is approximately 40% lighter than conventional lithium-ion batteries.

== History ==
NASA announced a prototype cell and pack architecture in July 2023.

=== SABERS ===
Solid-state Architecture Batteries for Enhanced Rechargeability and Safety program (SABERS) is a NASA program that researches advanced battery technologies for use in aircraft propulsion. The program funded the development of the new battery.

== Design ==
NASA's prototypes use a solid-state electrolyte. The cathode is made from sulfur and selenium. The prototype exceeds 1100 Wh/kg at a discharge rate of 0.4C, and 804 Wh/kg at a discharge rate of 1C. The anode is made from lithium metal. This cathode incorporates NASA-patented holey graphene technology provides a highly conductive, low-weight electrode scaffold. Lithium ions are the charge carrier.

NASA's prototypes can be stacked without a casing. Case-free stackability means that the battery's cooling systems can be smaller and lighter. Operating conventional batteries at full power causes rapid temperature increases. The prototype can operate at much higher temperatures than conventional lithium-ion batteries. In addition, they are less affected by pressure changes, which occur during takeoff and landing.
