= Ammonium trifluoromethanesulfonate =

Names
- IUPAC name Azanium trifluoromethanesulfonate
- Other names Ammonium triflate

Identifiers
CAS Number	38542-94-8
3D model (JSmol)	Interactive image
EC Number	629-264-0
PubChem CID	24861356
CompTox Dashboard (EPA)	DTXSID50578805
- InChI: InChI=1S/CHF3O3S.H3N/c2-1(3,4)8(5,6)7;/h(H,5,6,7);1H3 Key: BMWDUGHMODRTLU-UHFFFAOYSA-N
- SMILES: N.OS(=O)(=O)C(F)(F)F

Properties
Chemical formula	CH_{4}F_{3}NO_{3}S
Molar mass	167.10 g·mol^{−1}
Appearance	White crystalline solid
Melting point	224–226 °C (435–439 °F; 497–499 K)
Boiling point	245.5 °C (473.9 °F; 518.6 K)
Solubility in water	Soluble

Hazards
- GHS labelling
Pictograms	(GHS07: Exclamation mark)
Signal word	Warning
- Except where otherwise noted, data are given for materials in their standard state (at 25 °C [77 °F], 100 kPa). Infobox references

Ammonium trifluoromethanesulfonate or ammonium triflate is a chemical compound with the chemical formula CF_{3}SO_{3}NH_{4}. This is the ammonium salt of trifluoromethanesulfonic acid (triflic acid).

== Synthesis ==
The compound is typically prepared by neutralising trifluoromethanesulfonic acid with ammonia or an ammonium salt, followed by crystallisation.

== Properties ==
The compound is a white, crystalline powder, soluble in water.

== Uses ==
The compound exhibits strong acidity, making it useful as a reagent in various chemical reactions, particularly in organic synthesis and catalysis.

Ammonium triflate is widely investigated as an ionic dopant in solid polymer electrolytes, particularly those based on poly(ethylene oxide), iota‑carrageenan, or other biopolymers.
