= Liquified gas electrolyte =

Chemical compound

A liquified gas electrolyte (LGE) is a battery/capacitor electrolyte made by compressing an ambient pressure gas into liquid form. Candidate gases are those composed of reasonably polar molecules that can be liquified at pressures low enough to be accommodate in a standard battery can.

== Research ==
One study reported on a liquified hydrofluorocarbon (HFC) electrolyte. HFCs features relatively strong chemical bonds and a large electrochemical window that protect them from oxidation/reduction across charge/discharge cycles. It combined a moderate relative permittivity with low viscosity to produce a dielectric-fluidity factor and conductivity higher than existing solvents. Because of its low melting point, it has the potential for improved operation at low temperatures. Difluoromethane (CH_{2}F_{2}) was able to operate at a range of temperatures from –78° to +65 °C at 3.0 volts. Fluoromethane (CH_{3}F) showed dendrite-free ~97% platting and stripping efficiency on lithium metal over hundreds of cycles It further achieved good cycling and rate performance on a LiCoO_{2}cathode with discharge capacity retention of 60.6% at –60 °C. It reported that conductivity reversibly ended at high temperature as the salt precipitated near the supercritical point (~40° to 80 °C), reducing the potential for thermal runaway. However, the material's high saturated vapor pressure was a fire risk.

A later study by the same lab reviewed nonflammable 1,1,1,2-tetrafluoroethane and pentafluoroethane and reported >3 mS cm^{−1} ionic conductivity from −78 to +80 °C. Lithium cycling maintained >99% coulombic efficiency for over 200 cycles at 3 mA cm^{−2} and 3 mAh cm^{−2}. Li/NMC622 full batteries demonstrated stable cycling from −60 to +55 °C.

== See also ==
- Lithium ion battery
