= LLZO =

Lithium-stuffed garnet material

Identifiers
3D model (JSmol)	Interactive image
- InChI: InChI=1S/3La.7Li.12O.2Zr/q3*+3;7*+1;12*-2;2*+4 Key: SHSHVJZBGYRKOB-UHFFFAOYSA-N
- SMILES: [La+3].[La+3].[La+3].[Li+].[Li+].[Li+].[Li+].[Li+].[Li+].[Li+].[O-2].[O-2].[O-2].[O-2].[O-2].[O-2].[O-2].[O-2].[O-2].[O-2].[O-2].[O-2].[Zr+4].[Zr+4]

Properties
Chemical formula	La_{3}Li_{7}O_{12}Zr_{2}
Molar mass	839.73 g·mol^{−1}
- Except where otherwise noted, data are given for materials in their standard state (at 25 °C [77 °F], 100 kPa). Infobox references

Lithium lanthanum zirconium oxide (LLZO, Li_{7}La_{3}Zr_{2}O_{12}) or lithium lanthanum zirconate is a lithium-stuffed garnet material that is under investigation for its use in solid-state electrolytes in lithium-based battery technologies. LLZO has a high ionic conductivity and thermal and chemical stability against reactions with prospective electrode materials, mainly lithium metal, giving it an advantage for use as an electrolyte in solid-state batteries. LLZO exhibits favorable characteristics, including the accessibility of starting materials, cost-effectiveness, and straightforward preparation and densification processes. These attributes position this zirconium-containing lithium garnet as a promising solid electrolyte for all-solid-state lithium-ion rechargeable batteries.

Moreover, LLZO demonstrates a notable total conductivity, surpassing most other solid lithium-ion conductors and many lithium garnets. The fact that the total and bulk conductivities are of the same order of magnitude distinguishes LLZO garnet-type oxide as particularly attractive when compared to other ceramic lithium-ion conductors. This suggests that LLZO, with its garnet-like structure, holds significant promise for enhancing the performance of solid-state lithium-ion rechargeable batteries.

Since oxygen, zirconium, and lanthanum in LLZO are rigidly bound in the framework of the garnet-like structure, their mobility will be negligible at operating temperatures and, hence, the ionic motion is due to the transport of Li^{+} ions.

The enhanced lithium ion conductivity and reduced activation energy observed in LLZO, compared to other lithium-containing garnets, can be attributed to several factors. These include an expansion in the cubic lattice constant, an increase in lithium ion concentration, reduced chemical interactions between Li^{+} ions and other lattice ions, and improved densification. Even when compared to the conductivity of the relatively unstable polycrystalline Li_{3}N at lower temperatures, LLZO demonstrates comparable performance. However, at elevated temperatures, LLZO outperforms Li_{3}N, exhibiting a higher total conductivity.

LLZO has two stable phases: the tetragonal phase and the cubic (Cubic crystal system) phase. Although the tetragonal phase can be obtained at lower synthesis temperatures than the cubic phase, the latter has higher conductivity than the former. Both phases possess the same structural framework but there is a difference in the distribution of Li atoms, which dominantly determines the ionic conductivity of LLZO, Li ions have more available sites for migration in the cubic phase than in the tetragonal phase. Moreover, the cubic phase LLZO is very stable in air while the tetragonal phase suffers from a phase transition occurring at around 100 – 150 °C in air.

Press reports have stated that LLZO is believed to be the electrolyte used by QuantumScape for their solid-state lithium metal battery.

Japanese company Niterra is working on next-generation Lithium ion battery with LLZO as electrolyte.

LLZO has also been used as an electrolyte material in next-generation lithium-sulfur batteries.
