= LISICON =

Family of solids

LISICON is an acronym for lithium super ionic conductor, which refers to a family of solids with the chemical formula Li_{2+2x}Zn_{1−x}GeO_{4}.

The first example of this structure was discovered in 1977, providing a chemical formula of Li_{14}Zn(GeO_{4})_{4}. The crystal structure of LISICON consists of a network of [Li_{11}Zn(GeO_{4})_{4}]^{3-} as well as 3 loosely bonded Li^{+}. The weaker bonds allow for the lithium ions to easily move from site to site, not needing to break strong bonds to do so. Also, this structure forms large “bottlenecks” between the interstitial positions which these ions occupy, additionally lowering the energy required to move from site to site. These two factors allow for the lithium ions to diffuse quickly and easily through the structure. However, because of the shape of the channels through which these lithium ions can diffuse, they are limited to 2 dimensional diffusion. LISICON compounds have relatively high ionic conductivity, on the order of 10^{−6} S/cm at 25 °C. LISICONs readily react with lithium metal and atmospheric gases such as CO_{2}; as a result, their conductivity decreases with time.

== LISICON-like materials ==
There are other LISICON type solid electrolytes which make use of other elements to achieve higher ionic conductivities. One such material has the chemical formula of Li_{(3+x)}Ge_{x}V_{(1-x)}O_{4}, where the value of x is between 0 and 1. There are two compositions, Li_{3.5}Ge_{0.5}V_{0.5}O_{4} and Li_{3.6}Ge_{0.6}V_{0.4}O_{4}, which had ionic conductivities of 4*10^{−5} S/cm and 10^{−5} S/cm, an order of magnitude of improvement upon the base LISICON structure. These materials show good thermal stability and are stable in contact with CO_{2} and ambient atmosphere, dealing with some problems extant with the original structure.

There are materials with the chemical structure of Li_{(4-x)}Si_{(1-x)}P_{x}O_{4}. This is a solid solution between Li_{4}SiO_{4} and Li_{3}PO_{4}. This solid solution can be formed over the whole composition range at room temperature. The highest ionic conductivity is achieved at compositions of Li_{3.5}Si_{0.5}P_{0.5}O_{4} and Li_{3.4}Si_{0.4}P_{0.6}, with conductivity on the order of 10^{−6} S/cm. This results from the substitution of some Si^{4+} for P^{5+} in the lattice, resulting in the addition of interstitial Li-ions which diffuse much more easily. The ionic conductivity is further improved with the doping of Cl^{−} to replace O^{2-} in the lattice. The compositions Li_{10.42}Si_{1.5}P_{1.5}Cl_{11.92} and Li_{10.42}Ge_{1.5}P_{1.5}Cl_{11.92} achieved ionic conductivities of 1.03 * 10^{−5} S/cm and 3.7*10^{−5} S/cm respectively. This is theorized to be the due to the widening of the “bottlenecks” between interstitial points due to the Cl^{−} ions smaller size, and the weakening of the ionic bonding Li^{+} ions experienced due to chlorine's lower electronegativity.

The conductivities are almost 100 times higher in thio-LISICONs, where oxygen is replaced by sulfur, i.e. the corresponding thiosilicates. The bonding between S^{2-} and Li^{+} is weaker than that between O^{2-} and Li^{+}, allowing for the Li^{+} in the sulfide structure to be far more normal than its oxide counterparts. Ceramic thio-LISCON materials based on the chemical formula Li_{(4-x)}Ge_{(1-x)}P_{x}S_{4} are promising electrolyte materials, with ionic conductivities on the order of 10^{−3} S/m or 10^{−2} S/m.

== Applications ==
LISICONs can be used as the solid electrolyte in lithium-based solid-state batteries, such as solid state nickel–lithium battery. For this application, solid lithium electrolytes require ionic conductivities greater than 10^{−4} S/cm, negligible electronic conductivity, and a wide range of electrochemical stability.
