= Thiosilicate =

Inorganic silicon compound

In chemistry and materials science, thiosilicate refers to materials containing anions of the formula [SiS_{2+n}]^{2n−}. Derivatives where some sulfide is replaced by oxide are also called thiosilicates, examples being materials derived from the oxohexathiodisilicate [Si_{2}OS_{6}]^{6−}. Silicon is tetrahedral in all thiosilicates and sulfur is bridging or terminal. Formally such materials are derived from silicon disulfide in analogy to the relationship between silicon dioxide and silicates. Thiosilicates are typically encountered as colorless solids. They are characteristically sensitive to hydrolysis. They are from the class of chalcogenidotetrelates.

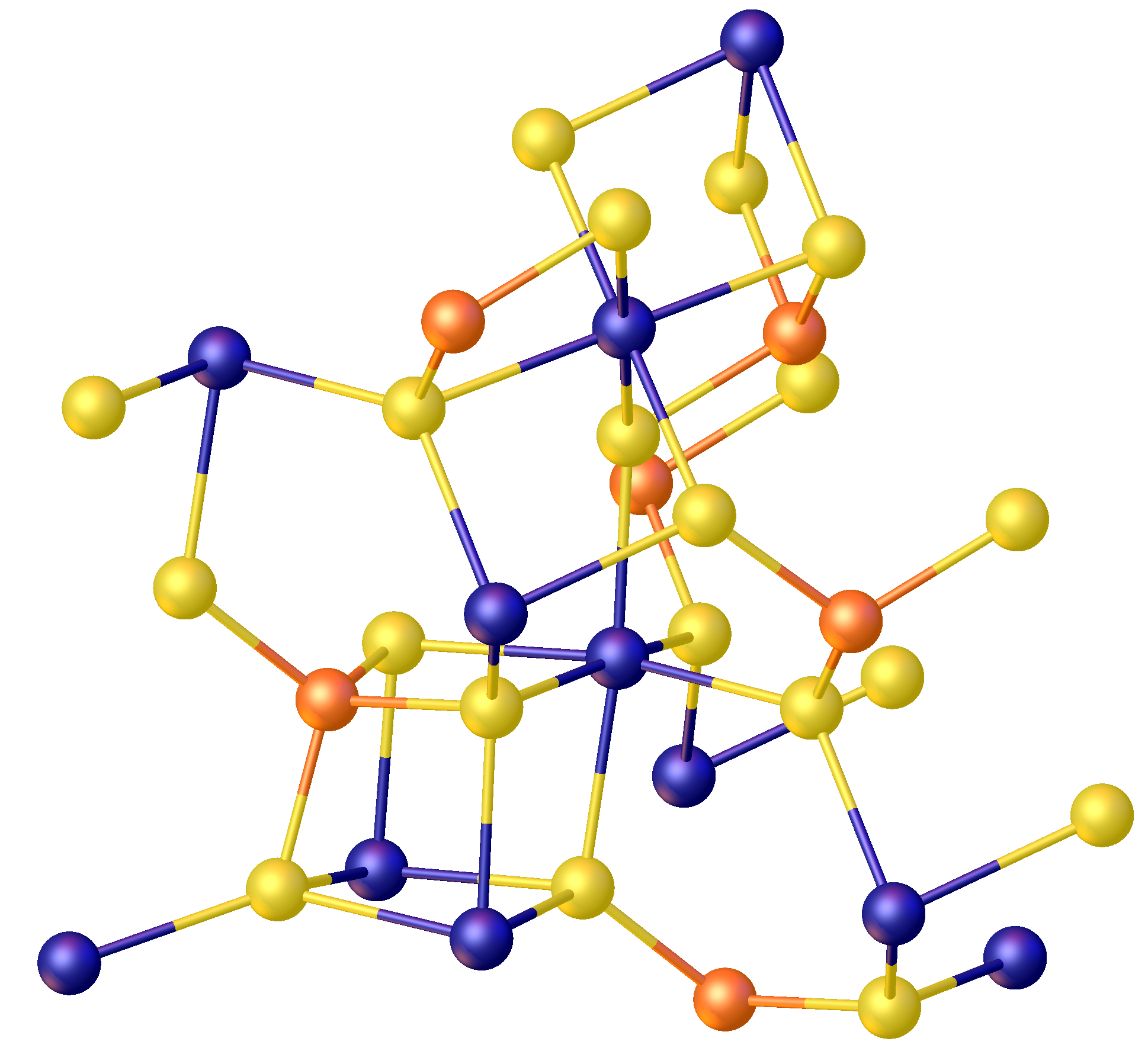
Structure of Fe_{2}(SiS_{4}). Fe is octahedral coordination, Si is tetrahedral. sulfides are bridging. Color code: S = yellow, Fe = blue, Si = orange.

== Materials science ==
The LISICON (LIthium Super Ionic CONductor) include thiosilicates, which are fast ion conductors. Thiosilicates and related thiogermanates are also of interest for infrared optics, since they only absorb low frequency IR modes.
