= Nickel–lithium battery =

Type of electrical battery

The nickel–lithium battery (Ni–Li) is a battery using a nickel hydroxide cathode and lithium anode. The two metals cannot normally be used together in a battery, as there are no electrolytes compatible with both. The LISICON design uses a layer of porous glass to separate two electrolytes in contact with each metal. The battery is predicted to hold more than twice as much energy per kilogram as lithium-ion batteries, and to be safer. However, the battery will be complex to manufacture and durability issues have yet to be resolved. Ni–Li has a very high cell potential, but is limited in capacity by the cathode material.
