= Ion gel =

An Ion gel (or Ionogel) is a composite material consisting of an ionic liquid immobilized by an inorganic or a polymer matrix. The material has the quality of maintaining high ionic conductivity while in the solid state. To create an ion gel, the solid matrix is mixed or synthesized in-situ with an ionic liquid. A common practice is to utilize a block copolymer which is polymerized in solution with an ionic liquid so that a self-assembled nanostructure is generated where the ions are selectively soluble. Ion gels can also be made using non-copolymer polymers such as cellulose, oxides such as silicon dioxide or refractory materials such as boron nitride.

== Types of Ion Gels ==
Ion gels can be divided in two broad classes based on the major component of the matrix in the composite: polymeric and inorganic. These broad classes can be further subdivided based on the chemical class of the matrix. Across typical ion gel applications, it is desired that the matrix components be electrically insulating to separate contacts within a device and supply ionic conductivity alone. The matrix selection of a material has ramifications on the ionic conductivity as well as the mechanical properties of the final composite material.

Inorganic Classes:

- Non-metal oxide (e.g. SiO_{2})
- Functionalized non-metal oxide
- Metal Oxide
- Ionic liquid tethered nanoparticles
- Metal Organic Framework
- Refractory Materials (e.g. boron nitride)

Polymeric Classes:

- Poly(ethylene oxide)
- Poly(methyl methacrylate)
- Poly(vinylidene fluoride)
- Poly(ethylene glycol) diacrylate
- Poly(acrylonitrile)

Although these subtypes of ion gels can classify many materials in this broad class, there are yet still hybrid materials that fall outside these categorizations. Examples have been demonstrated of ion gels with both polymeric and inorganic materials to provide both flexibility and strength in the final composite.

== Applications ==
Ion gels have been utilized in many electrical device systems such as in capacitors as dielectrics, as insulators for field effect transistors, and as electrolytes for lithium-ion batteries. The solid state and yet flexible form of ion gels are attractive for modern mobile devices such as formable screens, health monitoring systems, and solid state batteries. Especially for solid state battery applications, the high viscosity of ion gels provides sufficient strength to serve as both an electrolyte and separator between the anode and cathode. In addition, ion gels are sought after in battery applications as the viscoelastic flow of the gel under stress creates a high quality electrode/electrolyte contact compared to other solid state electrolytes.

== Thermal Stability ==
Ion gels have been known to be able to sustain upwards of 300 °C before onset of degradation. The high temperature capability is typically limited by the underlying ionic liquid, which can have a wide range of thermal stability, but are typically stable to at least 250 °C. This high temperature stability has been exploited to operate lithium-ion battery cells at lab scale up to 175 °C, which is well beyond the capabilities of current commercial electrolytes.

== Mechanical Properties ==
Given the variety of ion gels, the mechanical properties of this broad class of materials spans a wide range. Often mechanical properties are tailored towards the desired application. Applications that require high flexibility target a highly elastic matrix material such as a cross-linked polymer. These types of elastomeric materials offer high degree of elastic strain with full recovery, which is desirable in wearable devices that will undergo many stress cycles during their lifetime. Additionally, these types of materials can achieve up to 135% strain at failure indicating a degree of ductility. Applications that require higher strength ion gel will often use a refractory matrix to generate composite strengthening. This is particularly desirable in lithium-ion battery applications, which seek to deter the growth of lithium dendrites in the cell that can result in an internal short-circuit. A relationship has been established in lithium-ion batteries between high modulus, strong, solid electrolytes and a reduction in lithium dendrite growth. Thereby, a strong ion gel composite can improve the longevity of lithium-ion batteries through reduced internal short circuit failures.

The elastic resistance to flow of ion gels is often measure via Dynamic Mechanical Spectroscopy. This method reveals the storage modulus as well as the loss modulus, which define the stress-strain response of the gel. All ion gels are in the quasi-solid to solid state regime indicating that the storage modulus is higher than the loss modulus (i.e. elastic behavior prevails over the energy dissipating liquid-like behavior). The magnitude of the storage modulus and its ratio to the loss modulus dictate the strength and the toughness of composite material. Storage modulus values for ion gels can vary from approximately 1.0 kPa for typical polymeric-based matrices up to approximately 1.0 MPa for refractory-based matrices.

The structure of the composite matrix can play a large role in the outcome of the final bulk mechanical properties. This is especially true for inorganic based matrix materials. Several lab-scale examples have demonstrated a general trend that smaller matrix particle sizes can result in orders of magnitude increase in storage modulus. This has been attributed to higher surface area to volume ratio of the matrix particles and the higher concentration of nanoscale interactions between the particle and the immobilized ionic liquid. The higher the interaction forces between the components in the ion gel composite results in a higher force required for plastic deformation and an overall stiffer material.

Another degree of freedom in ion gel design lies in the ratio of matrix to ionic liquid in the final composite. As the concentration of ionic liquid in the matrix increases, the material will become more liquid-like in general corresponding to a decrease in storage modulus. Conversely, a decrease in concentration will generally strengthen the material and depending on the matrix material can generate a more elastomeric or brittle stress-strain response. The general tradeoff in a reduced concentration in ionic liquid is a subsequent decrease in ionic conductivity of the overall composite making optimization necessary for the specific application.
