= High Performance Polymers =

- Discipline: Chemistry
- Language: English
- Edited by: John Connell

Publication details
- History: 1989-present
- Publisher: SAGE Publications
- Frequency: 8/year
- Impact factor: 2.161 (2020)

Standard abbreviations
- ISO 4: High Perform. Polym.

Indexing
- CODEN: HPPOEX
- ISSN: 0954-0083 (print); 1361-6412 (web)
- LCCN: 93648956
- OCLC no.: 300291348

Links
- Journal homepage; Online access; Online archive

High Performance Polymers is a peer-reviewed scientific journal that covers the field of polymer chemistry, in particular molecular structure/processability/property relationships of high performance polymers such as liquid crystalline polymers. It is published eight times a year by SAGE Publications. The editor-in-chief is John Connell (NASA Langley Research Center).

== Abstracting and indexing ==
The journal is abstracted and indexed in Engineered Materials Abstracts, the Materials Science Citation Index, Scopus, and the Science Citation Index Expanded. According to the Journal Citation Reports, its 2020 impact factor is 2.161, ranking it 61st out of 91 journals in the category "Polymer Science".
