= Piezoelectric coefficient =

The piezoelectric charge coefficient or piezoelectric modulus, usually written d_{33}, quantifies the volume change when a piezoelectric material is subject to an electric field, or the polarization on the application of stress. In general, piezoelectricity is described by a tensor of coefficients $d_{ij}$; see Piezoelectricity § Mechanism for further details.

== See also ==
- List of piezoelectric materials
