= Polymer electrolytes =

Polymer matrix capable of ion conduction

A polymer electrolyte is a polymer matrix capable of ion conduction. Much like other types of electrolyte—liquid and solid-state—polymer electrolytes aid in movement of charge between the anode and cathode of a cell. The use of polymers as an electrolyte was first demonstrated using dye-sensitized solar cells. The field has expanded since and is now primarily focused on the development of polymer electrolytes with applications in batteries, fuel cells, and membranes. Polymer electrolytes are widely studied for use in next‑generation lithium‑ion and solid‑state batteries because they combine ion transport with mechanical stability, enabling safer alternatives to conventional liquid electrolytes.

== Molecular design of polymer electrolytes ==
Generally, polymer electrolytes comprise a polymer which incorporates a highly polar motif capable of electron donation. Performance parameters impact selection of homo- or heterogenous electrolyte. There exist four major types of polymer electrolyte: (1) gel polymer electrolyte, (2) solid-state polymer electrolyte, (3) plasticized polymer electrolyte, and (4) composite polymer electrolyte. The degree of crystallinity of a polymer electrolyte matrix impacts ion mobility and the transport rate. Amorphous regions promote greater percolation of charge in gel and plasticized polymer electrolytes. Crystal defects promote weaker chain-ion interactions.

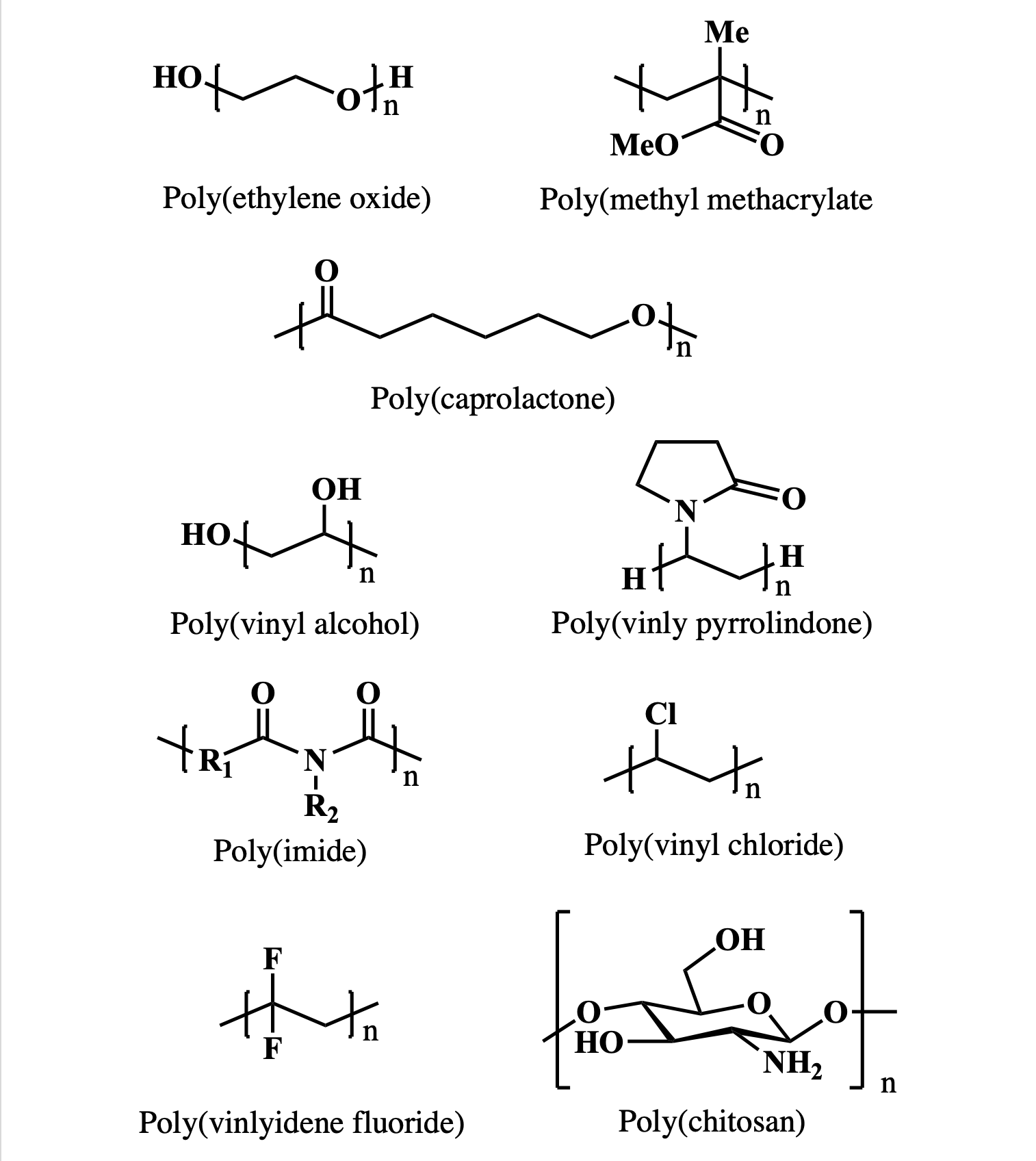
Several polymers capable of being used as polymer electrolytes. Each polymer incorporates a highly polar moiety capable of electron donation.

Another key parameter of transport is the temperature dependence of polymer morphology on transport mechanisms by the glass transition temperature. These electrolytes differ from one another in their processing methods and applications where they are to be used. Their properties and morphology can be tuned to that desired of the application they are intended for. A shared structural feature of these polymers is the presence of a heteroatom, namely nitrogen or oxygen, although sulfur has also been demonstrated.

=== Common polymers ===
- Poly(ethylene oxide)
- Poly(vinyl alcohol)
- Poly(methyl methacrylate)
- Poly(caprolactone)
- Poly(chitosan)
- Poly(vinyl pyrrolidone)
- Poly(vinyl chloride)
- Poly(vinylidene fluoride)
- Poly(imide)

Many of these polymers have other applications. The structures of several of these polymers are shown in the adjacent image. Showcases several of these polymers. Other types of polymers capable of ion conduction include polymeric ions, which incorporate either an oxidized (for anion transport) or reduced element of the polymer main chain through a process called chemical doping. Chemical doping makes these polymers behave as either n-type or p-type semiconductors.

=== Mechanical properties ===
The mechanical strength of a polymer electrolyte is an important parameter for its dendrite suppression capabilities. It is theorized that a polymer electrolyte with a shear modulus twice that of metallic lithium should be able to physically suppress dendrite formation. High elastic moduli or yield strengths can similarly decrease the uneven lithium deposition that leads to dendrite formation. Higher shear moduli polymer electrolytes have lower ionic conductivity due to their increased stiffness impeding polymer chain mobility and ion movement. The contrasting relationship between tensile strength and ionic conductivity inspires research into plasticized and composite polymer electrolytes.

== Types ==
=== Gel polymer electrolyte ===
Gel polymer electrolytes capture solvent constituents and aid in ion transport across the polymer matrix. The gel supports the polymer scaffold. It is noted that amorphous domains of these polymers absorb larger amounts of solvent (and swell accordingly) than do crystalline domains. As a result, ion conduction, which is primarily a diffusion-controlled process, is typically greater across regions of amorphous character than through crystalline domains. The adjacent image illustrates this process. An important aspect of gel electrolytes is the choice of solvent primarily based on their dielectric constants which is noted to impact ion conductivity. Percolation of charge does occur in highly ordered polymer electrolyte, but the number and proximity of amorphous domains is correlated with increased percolation of charge.

Gel polymer electrolytes using poly(ethylene oxide) (PEO) are the most studied due to its compatibility with lithium electrodes. However, the plasticizing of PEO decreases the mechanical strength of these electrolytes. Gel polymer electrolytes that combine PEO with mechanically strong polymers such as poly(vinylidene fluoride) (PVDF) can benefit from improved mechanical strength while maintaining the good electrochemical properties of PEO. A typical tensile strength for a gel polymer electrolyte is around 0.5 MPa, while typical yield strength and shear strength measurements are around 1 MPa. A typical elastic modulus for a gel polymer electrolyte is 10 MPa, which is two orders of magnitude below that of a typical liquid electrolyte.

Gel polymer electrolytes also shown specific applications for lithium-ion batteries to replace current organic liquid electrolytes. This type of electrolyte has also been shown to be able to be prepared from renewable and degradable polymers while remaining capable of mitigating current issues at the cathode-electrolyte interface.

=== Solid-state polymer electrolyte ===
Solid-state polymer electrolyte (also known as solid polymer electrolyte or solvent-free polymer electrolyte) arises from coordination of an inorganic salt to the polymer matrix. Application of a potential results in ion exchange through coordination, decoordination, and recoordination along the polymer. Performance of the electrochemical cell is influenced by the activity of the salt. The potential between the phases and charge transport through the electrolyte is impacted. Solid-state polymer electrolytes have also been employed in processing of gallium nitride wafers by providing a liquid- and radiation-free method of oxidizing the surface of the gallium nitride wafer to enable easier polishing of the wafer than previous methods.

Recent research has focused on characterizing the dynamics of solid polymer electrolytes (SPEs), including transference number, coordination strength, and conductivity. In SPEs, cations migrate through the electrolyte medium, driven by the electric field between the positive and negative electrodes. This migration is associated with the formation of polymer–salt complexes and is followed by localized motion of polymer segments, as well as inter- and intra-chain ion hopping between coordinating sites. Specifically, ion transport in SPEs can be described as a ligand exchange process within the coordination structure of the cations. Consequently, the coordination structure has a significant impact on the cation's contribution to the total conductivity.

=== Plasticized polymer electrolyte ===
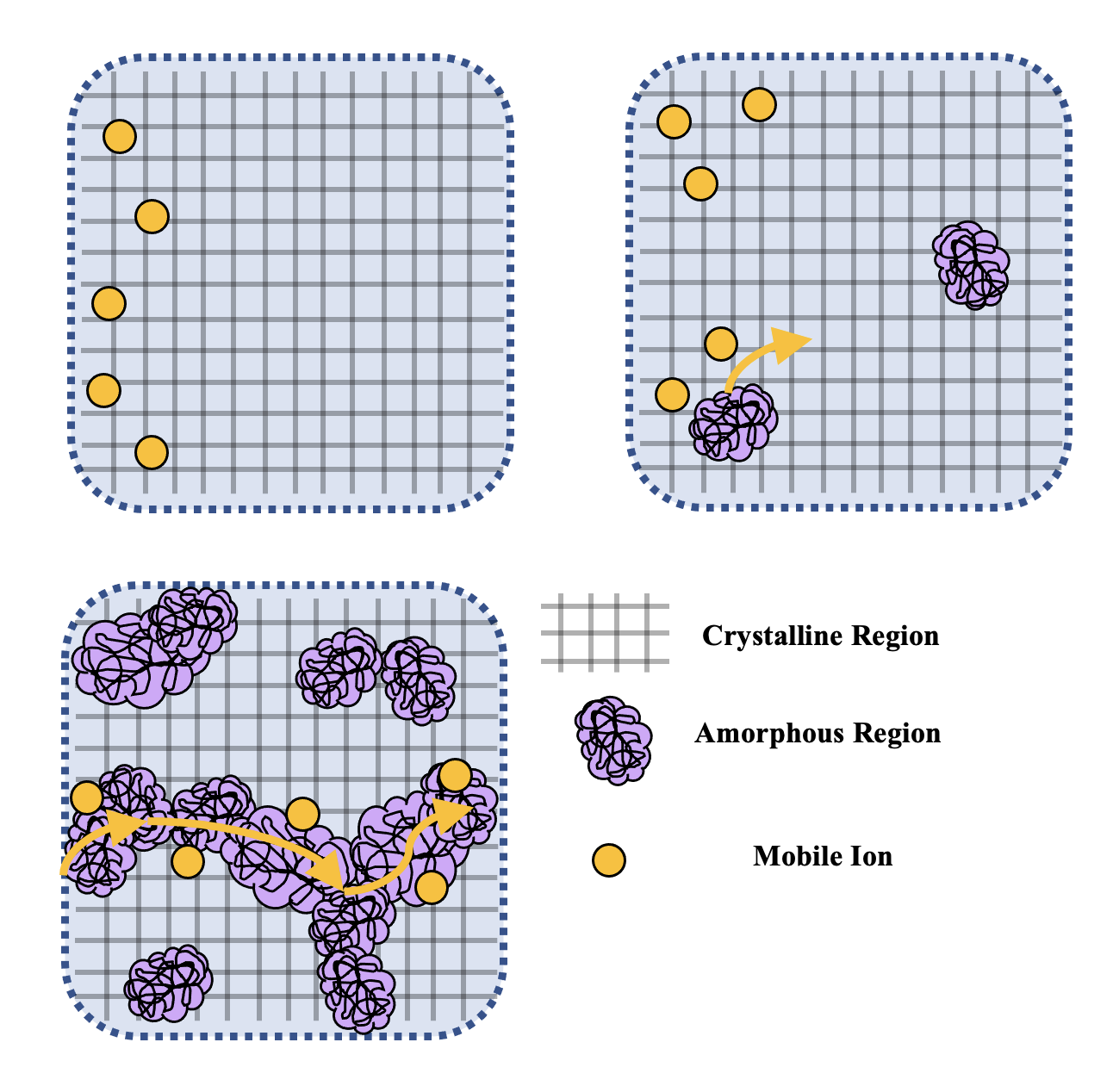
Transport of ions through polymer electrolytes requires presences of amorphous regions or crystal defects. Adapted from Aziz and coworkers.

Plasticized polymer electrolyte is a polymer matrix with incorporated plasticizers that enhance their ion conductivity by weakening intra- and interchain interactions that compete with ion-polymer interactions. A similar phenomenon to that previously discussed with polymer gel electrolytes is observed with plasticized polymer electrolytes. The addition of plasticizer lowers the glass transition temperature of the polymer and effectively enhances salt dissociation into the polymer matrix which increases the ability of the polymer electrolyte to transport ions. One limitation of plasticizer incorporation is the alteration of the polymer's mechanical properties. Reduction in the crystallinity of the polymer weakens its mechanical strength at room temperature. Plasticizers also modulate properties of polymer electrolytes other than conductivity such as affecting charge/discharge times and enhanced capacity.

=== Composite polymer electrolyte ===
Composite polymer electrolyte is a polymer matrix that incorporates inorganic fillers that are chemically inert, but with a high dielectric constant to enhance ion conductivity by inhibiting the formation of ion pairs in the polymer matrix. It has been demonstrated that the blending of polymer electrolytes with an inorganic filler affords a composite material with properties exceeding the sum of those of the individual components. In particular, ion conduction in polymer electrolytes is low (compared to liquid and solid-state electrolytes), but blending with inorganic materials has been shown to enhance the ion mobility and conductivity of the polymer electrolyte. The additional benefit is that the desirable properties of the polymer are maintained, particularly its mechanical strength.

Ceramic materials such as SiO_{2}, Al_{2}O_{3}, and TiO_{2} are popular filler materials that will improve the mechanical properties of the composite electrolyte, increase the lithium-ion transference number, and improve ionic conductivity. The improved conductivity comes from the decreased crystallinity of the material. On their own, these ceramic fillers are brittle and of low dielectric permittivity. Metal-organic framework (MOF) particles can also be used as a filler material with high surface area and high chemical and thermal stability. 2D boron nitride is a potential filler material due to its high mechanical strength arising from modulation of the electrolyte membrane.

== Ion transport mechanisms ==
Ion transport mechanisms will primarily focus on that for the transport of cations as the use of cation-conductive polymers is a greater area of academic focus due to the widespread use of lithium-ion batteries and other efforts aimed at developing multivalent metal ion batteries such as magnesium. Ion conductivity largely depends on the effective concentration of mobile ions (free ions), electric charge, and ion mobility. Ion mobility is defined as the ability of an ion to move between polar groups along the length of the main chain of a polymer.

=== Potential gradients ===
There exists two transport methods: by chemical potential (diffusion) and by electric potential. Ions partition between different phases of the electrolyte, and diffuse based on ionic conductivity, the salt diffusion coefficient of the electrolyte, and the cationic transference number. Ionic transport is also controlled by the electrical potential gradient across the cell.

=== Temperature dependence ===
Temperature dependence of electrolyte impacts performance over a range of temperatures. Glass temperature is shown to be the key point of performance. At or above the glass transition temperature, it is believed chain motions generate a free volume that the ions are able to transport through with aid weak, labile coordination between the ion and the parts of the polymer chain. In certain applications thin films of polymer electrolytes are needed, which necessitates careful control of morphology and properties due to deviations in the glass transition temperature and other mechanical properties associated with increasingly thin films of amorphous polymer electrolytes.

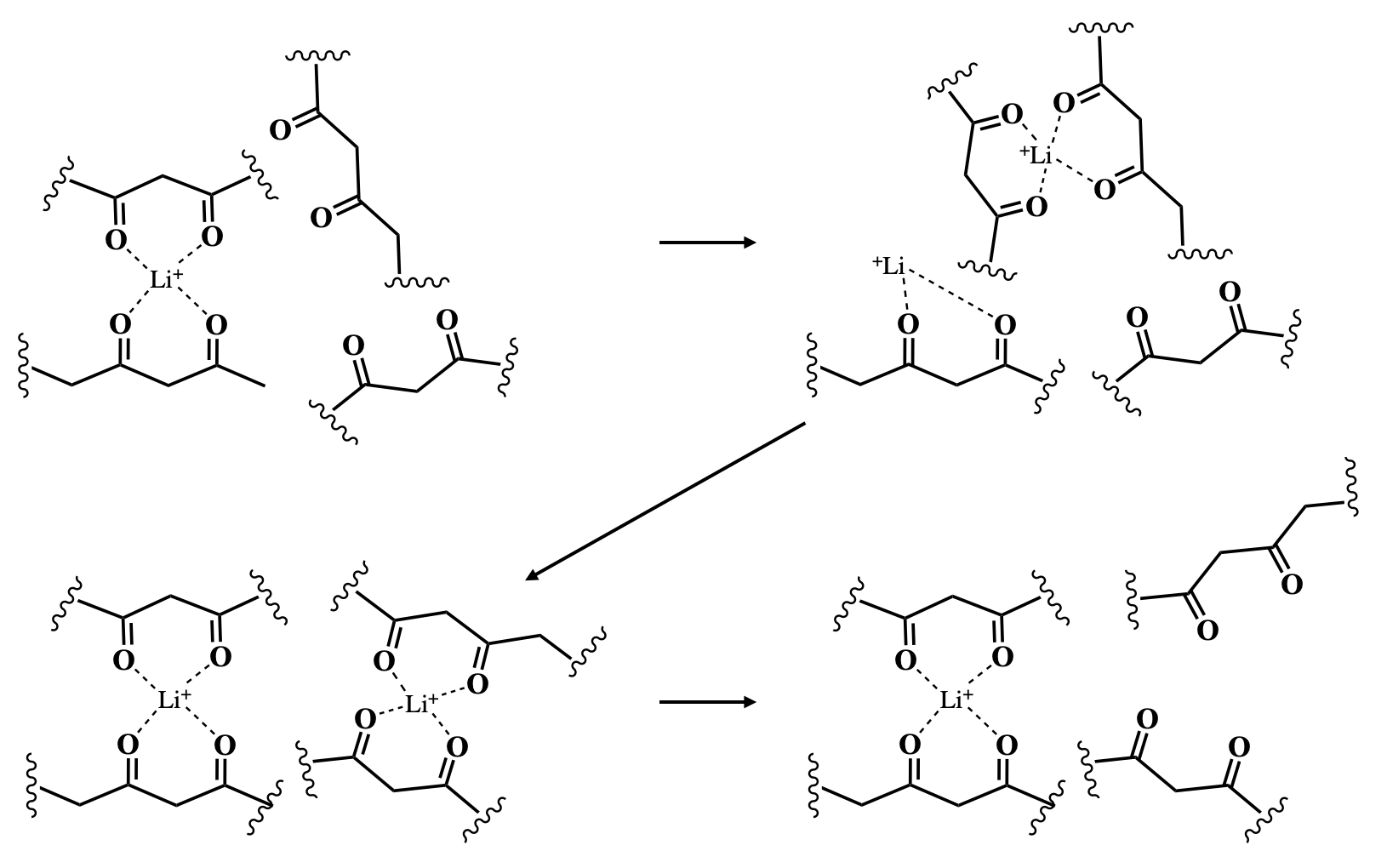
Chain short range ordering of polymer chains aid in transport of cations through loose coordination with nucleophilic moieties within the polymer structure.

=== Concentration and polymer mobility ===
Ion transport is impacted by concentration of the counterion and the ability of polymer chains to remain mobile. It is commonly believed that the greater the ability of a polymer matrix to move, the better the ion conductivity will be; however, this is not well understood as crystalline polymer electrolytes have been shown to be more conductive than an amorphous version of the same electrolyte. It is believed there are multiple modes of ion transport. In crystalline polymer electrolyte, the organization of the chains promotes the formation of interchain "tunnels" in which the ion of interest is able to hop between coordination sites, while the counterion moves along the polymer chain. These tunnels allows control over anion and cation flow in crystalline polymer electrolytes because they highly ordered crystalline domains are selective to an ion exclude its counter ion allowing for their separation. This can increase conductivity in crystalline polymer electrolytes. In amorphous polymers that show enhanced conductivity, it is propose that the amorphous character enables greater movement of chains and this increases mobility of ions as their coordination is transient. The adjacent image illustrates a possible mechanisms for ion transport through short range chain ordering and motions in amorphous regions of polymer electrolytes.

== Characterization ==
There are several factors to be optimized in the design of polymer electrolytes such as ion conductivity, mechanical strength, and being chemically inert. These properties are typically characterized using a variety of techniques that exist and are already employed in the characterization of conductive polymers.

=== Complex impedance spectroscopy ===
Complex impedance spectroscopy, also known as dielectric spectroscopy, enables characterization of the conductivity and permittivity of both heterogeneous and homogenous polymer electrolytes. The technique is useful for characterizing the electrical properties of bulk material and is capable of differentiating between the electrical properties of the bulk electrolyte and the electrical properties at the interface of the electrolyte with the electrode(s). Several important characteristics can be measured including impedance, admittance, modulus, and permittivity (dielectric constant and loss). Complex impedance spectroscopy has also been used to gain insight into how dopants and electrode parameters affect permittivity. Recent research has focused on probing the conducting relaxation of polymer electrolytes based on their conductance and electrode parameters.

Diagram showing use of a solid-state polymer electrolyte in a simple battery cell.

=== Additional techniques ===
Determination of the glass transition temperature, and methods for characterizing the mechanical properties of polymer electrolytes are also useful. Related to the glass transition are some of the proposed mechanisms for ion conduction. Other methods of thermal characterization include differential scanning calorimetry, thermogravimetric analysis, and methods used to characterize the specific electronic devices that these materials may be incorporated into.

== Applications ==
=== Distinctions from other electrolytes ===
Polymer electrolytes are distinct from solid inorganic and liquid electrolytes and offer several advantages including flexibility, processability, robustness, and safety. Conventional inorganic and liquid electrolytes are rigid or fail to perform in situations requiring high strain or bending forces, which can fracture the electrolyte or the vessel containing the electrolyte. Polymers, typically mixed with a plasticizer do not have this problem, which increases their desirability. Additionally, the high processability of compatible polymers results in simpler design and construction of the chemical cell. Polymer electrolytes also resist electrode volume changes associated with the charge and discharge of a cell. As a part of this, polymer electrolytes have been demonstrated to better resist the development of destructive dendrites in lithium-ion batteries. The shear moduli of polymer electrolytes exceed those of lithium metal, which aid in preventing dendrite growth. Blended polymer electrolytes prepared out of glassy and rubbery polymer have been demonstrates to all but halt dendrite formation, but they are limited by issues with conductivity. Finally, polymer electrolytes are relatively safe compared to liquid and solid-state batteries. Typically, these electrolytes are highly reactive in air and are flammable. Generally, it has been demonstrated that several polymer electrolytes resist degradation in air and resist combustion.

=== Batteries ===
Schematic diagram showcasing the used of a polymer electrolyte membrane in a solar cell.

Much of the interest in polymer electrolytes stems form their flexibility and enhanced safety over inorganic and liquid electrolytes alternatively used in batteries. Solid-state and composite electrolytes enable development of solid-state lithium-ion batteries. Dendrite formation is also noted to be limited by polymer electrolytes due to their ability to aid in halting growth of lithium crystals precipitating from the electrolyte. The performance of different polymers contributes some polymer electrolytes being better candidates than others for integration into a particular cell.

=== Membranes and fuel cells ===
Conductive polymer membranes are a growing area of application for polymer electrolytes. These membranes generally require high ionic conductivity, low permeability, thermal and hydrolytic stability, and morphological and mechanical stability. An example of membranes made from conductive polymer selective barriers in multifunctional micelles. Fuel cell applications of polymer electrolytes typically employ perfluorosulfonic acid membranes capable of selective proton conduction from the anode to the cathode. Such fuel cells are able to generate electrical energy from hydrogen or methanol fuels. However, current conductive polymer membranes are limited by requiring humidification, and the face durability issues related to their mechanical properties. The presence of a polymer electrolyte, particularly one that is solid-state enables reduction in device thickness and shorter mass transport distances which contribute to an overall enhanced cell efficiency over devices with other electrolytes.

=== Capacitors ===
Polymer electrolytes have also seen widespread use in capacitors. All-plastic capacitors can also be prepared by sandwiching either a solid-state polymer electrolyte between two plastic electrodes, or through connection electrodes through a polymeric ionic liquid electrolyte. Blends of polymer electrolytes such as poly(vinyl alcohol) and poly(chitosan) show high capacitance and stability and are an advantageous alternative to capacitors prepared with more resource sensitive materials.
