= Electrochemical window =

The electrochemical window (EW) of a substance is the electrode electric potential range between which the substance is neither oxidized nor reduced. The EW is one of the most important characteristics to be identified for solvents and electrolytes used in electrochemical applications. The EW is a term that is commonly used to indicate the potential range and the potential difference. It is calculated by subtracting the reduction potential (cathodic limit) from the oxidation potential (anodic limit).

When the substance of interest is water, it is often referred to as the water window.

This range is important for the efficiency of an electrode. Out of this range, the electrodes will react with the electrolyte, instead of driving the electrochemical reaction.

In principle, ammonia has an extremely small electrochemical window, but thermodynamically-favored reactions less than 1 V outside the window are very slow. Consequently, the electrochemical window for many practical reactions is much larger, comparable to water. Ionic liquids famously have a very large electrochemical window, about 4–5 V.

== The importance of electrochemical window (EW) in organic batteries ==
The electrochemical window (EW) is an important concept in organic electrosynthesis and design of batteries, especially organic batteries. This is because at higher voltage (greater than 4.0 V) organic electrolytes decompose and interferes with the oxidation and reduction of the organic cathode/anode materials. For this reason, the best organic electrolytes should be characterized by a wider range of electrochemical window, i.e., greater than the working range of the battery cell voltage. For example, the electrochemical window of Lithium bis- (trifluoromethanesulfonyl)imide, commercially known as LiTFSI is about 3.0 V because it can operate in the range of 1.9 -4.9 V. On the other hand, for electrolytes that are characterized by narrow electrochemical window, they are prone to irreversible decomposition, which in turn triggers the battery capacity decaying during subsequent battery cycling.

The electrochemical window of organic electrolyte depends on many factors that include temperature, molecular frontier orbitals such LUMO (Lowest Unoccupied Molecular Orbital) and HOMO (Highest occupied Molecular Orbital) because the mechanisms of reduction (electron gaining) and oxidation (electron loss) are governed by band gap between HOMO and LUMO. Solvation energy also plays an important role in defining the electrochemical window of the electrolyte.

In order to safeguard the thermodynamic stability working conditions of the electrode materials in a given electrolyte, the electrochemical potentials of the electrode materials (anode and cathode) must be comprised within the electrochemical stability of the electrolyte. This condition is very succinct because electrolyte might be oxidized when the cathode material possess an electrochemical potential, which is less than the electrolyte oxidation potential. When the electrochemical potential of the anode material is quite higher than the reduction potential of the electrolyte, the electrolyte will be degraded through reduction process.

== Limitation of Electrochemical window ==
One of the shortcoming of electrochemical window (EW) in predicting the stability of the electrolyte towards anode or cathode materials ignores the voltage and the ionic conductivity, which are also important.
