= Ionic conductivity (solid state) =

Measure of a substance's tendency towards ionic conduction

A proton conductor in a static electric field.

Ionic conductivity (denoted by λ) is the movement of ions through a solid material, a phenomenon central to solid-state ionics. It is denoted by λ and measured in siemens per meter (S/m). While perfect crystals of inorganic compounds are typically electrical insulators, ionic conduction arises when defects are introduced—either intrinsically through thermal activation or extrinsically via doping with aliovalent impurities. These defects enable ion migration by providing pathways through the crystal lattice. Solid ionic conductors, known as solid electrolytes, are critical components in technologies such as all-solid-state batteries, supercapacitors, fuel cells, and thin-film microelectronic devices. The ionic conductivity (σ) follows an Arrhenius-type relationship with temperature, governed by activation energy barriers influenced by crystal structure and defect chemistry. Ionic conduction is one mechanism of current.

== In crystalline solids ==
In most solids, ions rigidly occupy fixed positions, strongly embraced by neighboring atoms or ions. In some solids, selected ions are highly mobile allowing ionic conduction. The mobility increases with temperature. Materials exhibiting this property are used in batteries. A well-known ion conductive solid is β''-alumina ("BASE"), a form of aluminium oxide that has channels through which sodium cations can hop. When this ceramic is complexed with a mobile ion, such as Na^{+}, it behaves as so-called fast ion conductor. BASE is used as a membrane in several types of molten salt electrochemical cell.

=== History ===
Ionic conduction in solids has been a subject of interest since the beginning of the 19th century. Michael Faraday established in 1839 that the laws of electrolysis are also obeyed in ionic solids like lead(II) fluoride (PbF_{2}) and silver sulfide (Ag_{2}S). In 1921, solid silver iodide (AgI) was found to have had extraordinary high ionic conductivity at temperatures above 147 °C, AgI changes into a phase that has an ionic conductivity of ~ 1 –1 cm^{−1}. This high temperature phase of AgI is an example of a superionic conductor. The disordered structure of this solid allows the Ag^{+} ions to move easily. The present record holder for ionic conductivity is the related material Ag_{2}[HgI_{4}]. β''-alumina was developed at the Ford Motor Company in the search for a storage device for electric vehicles while developing the sodium–sulfur battery.

== See also ==
- Lattice energy
- Fast ion conductor
- NASICON
