= Anode-free battery =

Type of energy-storing battery

An anode-free battery (AFB) is one that is manufactured without an anode and instead creates a metal anode the first time it is charged. The anode is formed from charge carriers supplied by the cathode. As such, before charging, the battery consists of a cathode, current collectors, separator and electrolyte.

== Background ==
Conventional batteries use an anode made of graphite. However, the graphite consumes space, adds weight, adds to materials costs, and increases manufacturing complexity. As of 2023, the most practical designs that support lithium metal batteries are anode-free.

== Design ==
Anode-free batteries typically require a solid-state electrolyte made of a ceramic or polymer. This is to ensure that over many charge/discharge cycles, dendrites that may form on the anode-side current collector do not cross the electrolyte and short circuit the battery. Some solid-state designs use conventional graphite anodes.

The charge carriers electroplate lithium onto the anode current collector surface, there offering a solid electrolyte interphase (SEI). After the initial charge, an AFB operates as a lithium metal battery. By eliminating the permanent lithium metal anode, AFBs operate with all the lithium acts as a charge carrier, rather than remaining at the anode (zero excess lithium). Manufacturing a lithium anode is also complex, as this involves making and manipulating a thin lithium foil, given its high reactivity and viscosity. However, some lithium is lost in each charge/discharge cycle, reducing cycle counts. Deposited lithium also tends to be of uneven depth and is more likely to produce dendrites. solid electrolyte interphase

=== Cathode ===
Anode-free lithium ion batteries have been demonstrated using a variety of cathode materials, such as LiFePO_{4}, LiCoO_{2}, and LiNi_{1/3}Mn_{1/3}Co_{1/3} (NMC_{111}).

These intercalation-type cathodes typically offer limited Li content (14.3 at.% for LiFePO_{4}, 25 at.% for LiCoO_{2} and LiNi_{x}Co_{y}Mn_{1-x-y}O_{2}), although they remain the primary research targets. Oxide cathodes may release reactive oxygen radicals that trigger side reactions with flammable organic electrolytes. By contrast, lithium sulfide can reach 67% lithium. When fully lithiated, the cathode experiences negligible volume changes during cycling. However, Li_{2}S cathodes may suffer initial activation overpotential (~1.0 V) and poor charge kinetics.

== Research ==
QuantumScape has developed one such battery. The company claimed an energy density of 325-440 Wh/kg (900-1,100 Wh/l) for its solid-state battery. As of 2020 the battery could sustain 800 cycles before dropping to 80% of its original capacity. Production is scheduled for the back half of 2024.

Our Next Energy (ONE) has demonstrated a battery pack that claims to offer 1,000 Wh/L. Each prismatic cell offers 240 Ah. To address limitations of power output, cycle life, and safety levels, the company adopted a dual-chemistry battery architecture, in which LFP cells are the primary power source, while its anode-free battery cells (LiMnO cathode) would be used to used to handle longer trips. This was expected to reduce cycles and peak power requirements by 90%.

Samsung reported a high-nickel layered oxide cathode in a prototype pouch cell that offered >900 Wh/l, with stable Coulombic efficiency (>99.8%) over 1,000 cycles.

Researchers at Pacific Northwest National Laboratory (PNNL) developed an anode-free device that uses a salt/salt electrolyte mixture dissolved in a solvent, solvent mixture, and/or polymer. The salt can be of various types of lithium salts.

ION Storage Systems demonstrated a solid-state battery that lasted 125 cycles with less than 5% capacity loss. They use a 3-D ceramic structure in place of the anode. The battery is the first to satisfy the Advanced Research Projects Agency–Energy/Department of Energy room temperature charging goals.

Anode-free batteries must address low-capacity oxygen-releasing intercalation cathodes and flammable liquid electrolytes. One alternative adopted a quasi-solid-state, non-flammable, polymeric gel electrolyte with lithium sulfide cathodes. The research claimed energy density of 1323 Wh L−1 at the pouch cell level. The design avoids uncontrolled exothermic reactive oxygen reactions and excess Li. The electrolyte employs MXene-doped fluorinated polymer that avoids polysulfide shuttling, and reduces dendrites. Cell safety against mechanical, electrical and thermal abuses was improved.
