= Glass battery =

Type of solid-state electric battery

The glass battery is a type of solid-state battery. It uses a glass electrolyte and lithium or sodium metal electrodes.

== Development history ==
In 2009, Nippon Electric Glass and Iwate University developed the first thin-film lithium-ion battery on ultra‑thin glass substrate with a thickness of 30 micrometres (μm).

In 2016, a glass battery was developed by John B. Goodenough, inventor of the lithium cobalt oxide and lithium iron phosphate electrode materials used in the lithium-ion battery (Li-ion), and Maria H. Braga, an associate professor at the University of Porto and a senior research fellow at Cockrell School of Engineering at The University of Texas. The paper describing the battery was published in Energy & Environmental Science in December 2016.

A number of follow-up works have been published since then. Hydro-Québec is researching the battery for possible production.

=== Glass electrolyte research ===
In September 2016 Iowa State University was granted U.S. $1.6 million to develop new lithium-ion-conducting glassy solid electrolytes. In August 2019, it was announced that GM was awarded U.S. $2 million by the United States Department of Energy for research into the "fundamental understanding of interfacial phenomena in solid-state batteries" and "hot pressing of reinforced all-solid-state batteries with sulfide glass electrolyte".

In 2023, Nippon Electric Glass developed the first glass-ceramic solid-state sodium-ion battery using a glass-ceramic solid electrolyte.

=== Skepticism and reaction to skepticism ===
The initial publication in December 2016 was met with considerable skepticism by other researchers in battery technology, with several noting that it is unclear how a battery voltage is obtained given that pure metallic lithium or sodium exists on both electrodes, which should not produce a difference in electrochemical potential, and therefore give no cell voltage. Any energy stored or released by the battery would therefore violate the first law of thermodynamics. Goodenough's high reputation was enough to deter the strongest criticism however, with Daniel Steingart of Princeton University commenting, "If anyone but Goodenough published this, I would be, well, it's hard to find a polite word." A formal comment was published by Steingart and Venkat Viswanathan from Carnegie Mellon University in Energy & Environmental Science.

Goodenough responded to the skepticism, stating: "The answer is that if the lithium plated on the cathode current collector is thin enough for its reaction with the current collector to have its Fermi energy lowered to that of the current collector, the Fermi energy of the lithium anode is higher than that of the thin lithium plated on the cathode current collector." Goodenough went on to say in a later interview with Slashdot that the lithium plated on the cathode is on the "order of a micron thick".

Goodenough's response has drawn further skepticism from Daniel Steingart and also Matthew Lacey of Uppsala University, who point out that this underpotential deposition effect is only known for extremely thin layers (monolayers) of materials. Lacey also notes that the original publication does not mention a limit to the thickness of the lithium plated on the cathode, but instead states the opposite: that the capacity of the cell is "determined by the amount of alkali metal used as the anode".

== Construction and electrochemistry ==
The battery, as reported in the original publication, is constructed using an alkali metal (lithium or sodium foil) as the negative electrode (anode), and a mixture of carbon and a redox active component, as the positive electrode (cathode). The cathode mixture is coated onto copper foil. The redox active component is either sulfur, ferrocene, or manganese dioxide. The electrolyte is a highly conductive glass formed from lithium hydroxide and lithium chloride and doped with barium, allowing fast charging of the battery without the formation of metal dendrites.

The publication states the battery operates during discharge by stripping the alkali metal from the anode and re-depositing it at the cathode, with the battery voltage determined by the redox active component and the capacity of the battery determined by the amount of the alkali metal anode. This operating mechanism is radically different from the insertion (intercalation) mechanism of most conventional Li-ion battery materials.

In 2018, a new version was described by most of the same authors in the Journal of the American Chemical Society, in which the cathode is coated with a special plasticiser solution to avoid interface cracking as different materials expand at different rates. Braga says the new battery has twice the energy density of conventional lithium-ion batteries, and can be recharged 23,000 times. Critics pointed out several extraordinary claims in the paper, such as a record-high relative dielectric constant; perhaps higher than any material recorded, and a raise in the capacitance of the battery over many charge cycles, rather than a decrease as is usually the case with all other battery technologies. The paper was also not clear if the battery could hold its charge after it is unplugged, which would clarify whether it is really a new battery technology, or simply a capacitor. Braga responded to critics, saying "Data is data, and we have similar data from many different cells, in four different instruments, different labs, glove box. And at the end of the day, the LEDs are lit for days with a very small amount of active material after having cycled for more than 23,000 times".

== Comparison with lithium-ion batteries ==
Braga and Goodenough stated they expect the battery to have an energy density many times higher than current lithium-ion batteries, as well as an operating temperature range down to −20 °C (−4 °F); much lower than current solid-state batteries. The electrolyte is also stated to have a wide electrochemical window. The battery's design is safer than lithium-ion batteries, as the use of a flammable liquid electrolyte is avoided. The battery can also be made using low-cost sodium instead of lithium.

The authors claim the battery has a much shorter charging time than Li-ion batteries—in minutes rather than hours. The authors also state they tested the stability of the alkali metal/electrolyte interface over 1,200 charge cycles with low cell resistance; the specification for Li-ion batteries is usually less than a thousand.

== See also ==
- List of battery types
