= Golden Feather New Energy =

Chinese solid-state battery company

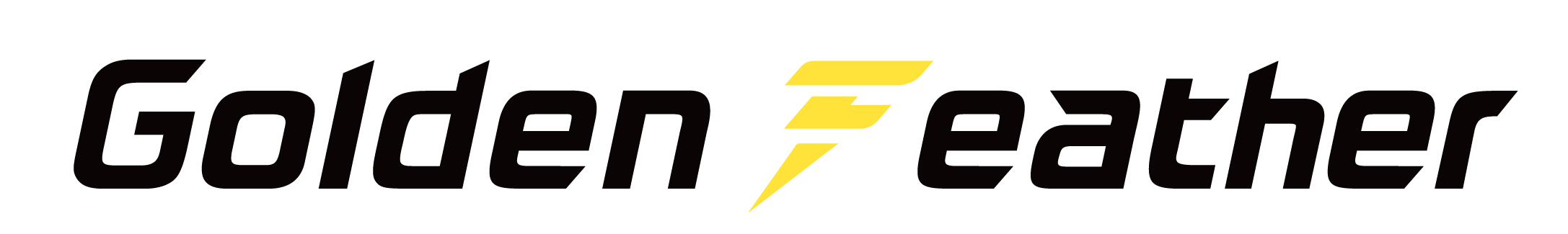
- Native name: 浙江金羽新能源科技有限公司
- Type: Private
- Industry: Solid-state batteries
- Founded: June 19, 2017
- Headquarters: Zhejiang, China
- Key people: Huang Dubin
- Products: Solid-state batteries; Semi-solid-state batteries
- Website: www.gfenergy.com

Golden Feather New Energy (Chinese: 浙江金羽新能源科技有限公司), commonly known as GF New Energy, is a company engaged in the research, development and manufacturing of solid-state and lithium metal batteries. The company was founded in 2017 and is headquartered in Zhejiang, China, with a research center in Beijing and manufacturing bases in Hangzhou and Huzhou.

== History ==
Golden Feather New Energy was established in 2017 by a team of researchers from Peking University and other institutions. Early work focused on solid-state battery materials and cell structures, followed by efforts toward industrialization. In 2019, the company established an industrial base in Anji, Zhejiang Province.

In 2021, the company completed a Pre-A+ round of financing and began pilot production and product validation. In 2023, the company entered a Series A financing stage.

In 2025, its full solid-state lithium metal battery products completed validation and were delivered to customers. In 2026, a 1.2 GWh solid-state battery production line in Hangzhou was put into operation.

== Products ==
The company develops solid-state and semi-solid-state batteries, with applications in unmanned aerial vehicles and other electrification scenarios. It conducts research in lithium metal batteries, solid electrolytes and related technologies, and promotes their commercialization.

Golden Feather New Energy has established manufacturing bases in Hangzhou and Huzhou, Zhejiang Province, alongside a research center in Beijing. Reports indicate that its products have entered early-stage commercial application. Golden Feather New Energy has been recognized as a "Specialized and Sophisticated SME" and a high-tech enterprise. The company has applied for over 100 patents. The company has also appeared in research output and institutional datasets.
