= Solid-state battery =

Battery with solid electrodes and a solid electrolyte

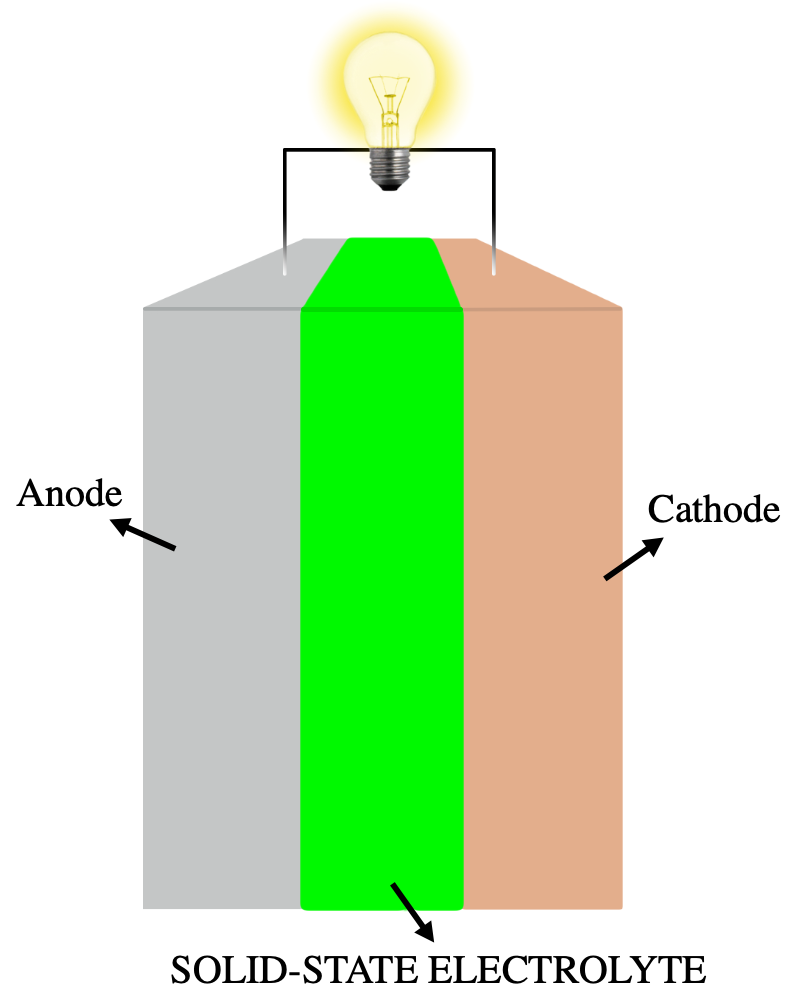
- All-solid-state battery with a solid electrolyte between two electrodes
- Specific energy: Thin film type: 300–900 Wh/kg (490–1,470 kJ/lb); Bulk type: 250–500 Wh/kg (410–820 kJ/lb); Laminate type : 300–600 Wh/kg (490–980 kJ/lb)
- Self-discharge rate: 6%ｰ85 °C (month)
- Cycle durability: 10,000-100,000 cycles
- Nominal cell voltage: Thin film type: 4.6 V Bulk type: 2.5 V,
- Charge temperature interval: -20 °C 〜 105 °C

A solid-state battery (SSB) is an electrical battery that uses a solid electrolyte to conduct ions between the electrodes, instead of the liquid or gel polymer electrolytes found in conventional batteries. Theoretically, solid-state batteries offer much higher energy density than the typical lithium-ion or lithium polymer batteries.

While solid electrolytes were first discovered in the 19th century, several problems prevented widespread application. Developments in the late 20th and early 21st century generated renewed interest in the technology, especially in the context of electric vehicles. As of 2026, the solid-state battery market has yet to reach scalability and commercialization.

Solid-state batteries can use metallic lithium for the anode and oxides or sulfides for the cathode, improving energy density. The solid electrolyte acts as an ideal separator that allows only lithium ions to pass through, allowing solid-state batteries to potentially solve many liquid electrolyte Li-ion battery problems including flammability, voltage range, unstable electrode interface formation, cycling performance, and mechanical strength.

Materials proposed for use as solid electrolytes include ceramics (e.g., oxides, sulfides, phosphates), and solid polymers.

Solid-state batteries are found in pacemakers and in RFID and wearable devices. These batteries offer enhanced safety and higher energy densities. To achieve widespread adoption over lithium ion batteries, solid-state batteries need to overcome many challenges, including the chemical and electrochemical stability of the electrode-electrolyte interfaces, ionic conductivity at room temperature, the mechanical compatibility of components during operational cycles, the scalability of manufacturing processes, and the reduction of industrial costs.

== History ==
=== Origin ===
Between 1831 and 1834, Michael Faraday discovered the solid electrolytes silver sulfide and lead(II) fluoride, which laid the foundation for solid-state ionics. Through his research, Faraday took note of these solid compounds transitioning from insulators to conductors after being heated. In 1963, over a century later, Michael O'Keeffe acknowledged the ionic/electronic conductivity of these solid electrolytes when combined with electrodes to become one of the first records of a practical solid-state battery.

By the late 1950s, several silver-conducting electrochemical systems employed solid electrolytes, at the price of low energy density and cell voltages, and high internal resistance. In 1967, the discovery of fast ionic conduction β-alumina for a broad class of ions (Li+, Na+, K+, Ag+, and Rb+) kick-started the development of solid-state electrochemical devices with increased energy density. The first were molten sodium / β-alumina / sulfur cells developed at Ford Motor Company in the US, and NGK in Japan. This excitement manifested in the discovery of new systems in both organics, i.e. poly(ethylene) oxide (PEO), and inorganics such as NASICON. However, many of these systems required operation at temperatures greater than 300 °C (or 572 °F) and were expensive to produce, limiting commercial deployment and funding towards research efforts in the space.

=== 1990s and 2000s ===
A new class of solid-state electrolyte developed by Oak Ridge National Laboratory, lithium–phosphorus oxynitride (LiPON), emerged in the 1990s. LiPON was successfully used to make thin-film lithium-ion batteries, although applications were limited due to the cost associated with deposition of the thin-film electrolyte, along with the small capacities that could be accessed using the thin-film format.

=== 2010s ===
In the 2010s, automotive companies began researching practical application of using solid state technology. Kamaya et al. demonstrated in 2011 the first solid-electrolyte, Li_{10}GeP_{2}S_{12} (LGPS), capable of achieving a bulk ionic conductivity in excess of liquid electrolyte counterparts at room temperature, allowing technological competition with proven Li-ion liquid electrolytes.

In 2011, Bolloré launched a fleet of their BlueCar model cars featuring a 30kWh lithium metal polymer (LMP) battery with a polymeric electrolyte, created by dissolving lithium salt in polyoxyethylene co-polymer. In 2012, Toyota began researching automotive applications of solid-state batteries. Concurrently, Volkswagen began partnering with Quantumscape and others specializing in the technology. Researchers at the University of Colorado Boulder announced in 2013 the spinout of Solid Power and the development of a solid-state lithium battery, with a solid iron–sulfur composite cathode touting higher energy density.

In 2017, Toyota extended its decades-long partnership with Panasonic to include collaboration on solid-state batteries. As of 2019 Toyota held the most SSB-related patents. The following years similar research efforts into solid-state batteries was separately announced by BMW, Honda, Hyundai (with Solid Power and Samsung), and Nissan.

Outside of the automotive sector, other research and development in the 2010s included: solid-state batteries for electronics by Qing Tao announced in 2018; and a solid-state glass battery by John Goodenough, the co-inventor of Li-ion batteries, unveiled in 2017, featuring a glass electrolyte and an alkali-metal anode consisting of lithium, sodium or potassium.

=== 2020s ===
Many companies have announced readiness to commercialize solid-state batteries at the GWh scale in the 2020s, but their batteries' feasibility or technology readiness is unknown. These announcements include: ProLogium – GWh production capacity by 2022; QuantumScape – GWh production capacity by 2024; Qing Tao – GWh production capacity by 2020; Ampcera – commercial availability by 2021; Panasonic and Toyota – market maturity by 2025; Solid Power, BMW, and Ford – market maturity by end of 2020s; WeLion – GWh production capacity by 2022; StoreDot; Honda – market maturity by 2030; Ionic Materials and Hyundai – market maturity in the 2030s; Donut Lab - GWh production in January 2026; and others.

As of January 2026, many of these companies have not commercialized their products and the solid-state battery market has yet to reach scalability and commercialization.

== Materials ==
Candidate materials for solid-state electrolytes (SSEs) include ceramics such as lithium orthosilicate, glass, sulfides and RbAg_{4}I_{5}. Mainstream oxide solid electrolytes include Li_{1.5}Al_{0.5}Ge_{1.5}(PO_{4})_{3} (LAGP), Li_{1.4}Al_{0.4}Ti_{1.6}(PO_{4})_{3} (LATP), perovskite-type Li_{3x}La_{2/3-x}TiO_{3} (LLTO), and garnet-type Li_{6.4}La_{3}Zr_{1.4}Ta_{0.6}O_{12} (LLZO) with metallic Li. The thermal stability versus Li of the four SSEs was in order of LAGP < LATP < LLTO < LLZO. Chloride superionic conductors have been proposed as another promising solid electrolyte. They are ionic conductive as well as deformable sulfides, but at the same time not troubled by the poor oxidation stability of sulfides. Other than that, their cost is considered lower than oxide and sulfide SSEs. The present chloride solid electrolyte systems can be divided into two types: Li_{3}MCl_{6} and Li_{2}M_{2/3}Cl_{4}. M Elements include Y, Tb-Lu, Sc, and In. The cathodes are lithium-based. Variants include LiCoO_{2}, LiNi_{1/3}Co_{1/3}Mn_{1/3}O_{2}, LiMn_{2}O_{4}, and LiNi_{0.8}Co_{0.15}Al_{0.05}O_{2}. The anodes vary more and are affected by the type of electrolyte. Examples include In, Si, Ge_{x}Si_{1−x}, SnO–B_{2}O_{3}, SnS –P_{2}S_{5}, Li_{2}FeS_{2}, FeS, NiP_{2}, and Li_{2}SiS_{3}.

Lithium-ceramic batteries demonstrate potential improvements with the integration of single wall carbon nanotubes (SWCNTs). SWCNTs build durable, long-range conductive pathways between electrode particles, effectively reducing electrode resistance and enhancing energy density.

One promising cathode material is Li–S, which (as part of a solid lithium anode/Li_{2}S cell) has a theoretical specific capacity of 1,670 mAh/g, "ten times larger than the effective value of LiCoO_{2}". Sulfur makes an unsuitable cathode in liquid electrolyte applications because it is soluble in most liquid electrolytes, dramatically decreasing the battery's lifetime. Sulfur is studied in solid-state applications.

Another encouraging cathode is NCM662 (LiNi_{0.6}Co_{0.2}Mn_{0.2}O_{2}), especially when coated with NiCo_{2}S_{4} in a resonant acoustic mixing process. This creates a material with a capacity retention of 60.6%, with minimal side reactions.

Li-O_{2} also have high theoretical capacity. The main issue with these devices is that the anode must be sealed from ambient atmosphere, while the cathode must be in contact with it.

A Li/LiFePO_{4} battery shows promise as a solid-state application for electric vehicles. A 2010 study presented this material as a safe alternative to rechargeable batteries for EV's that "surpass the USABC-DOE targets".

A cell with a pure silicon μSi||SSE||NCM811 anode was assembled by Darren H.S Tan et al. using μSi anode (purity of 99.9 wt %), solid-state electrolyte (SSE) and lithium–nickel–cobalt–manganese oxide (NCM811) cathode. This kind of solid-state battery demonstrated a high current density up to 5 mA cm^{−2}, a wide range of working temperature (-20 °C and 80 °C), and areal capacity (for the anode) of up to 11 mAh/cm^{2} (2,890 mAh/g). At the same time, after 500 cycles under 5 mA cm^{−2}, the batteries still provide 80% of capacity retention, which is the best performance of μSi all solid-state battery reported so far.

Chloride solid electrolytes also show promise over conventional oxide solid electrolytes owing to chloride solid electrolytes having theoretically higher ionic conductivity and better formability. In addition chloride solid electrolyte's exceptionally high oxidation stability and high ductility add to its performance. In particular a lithium mixed-metal chloride family of solid electrolytes, Li_{2}In_{x}Sc_{0.666-x}Cl_{4} developed by Zhou et al., show high ionic conductivity (2.0 mS cm^{−1}) over a wide range of composition. This is owing to the chloride solid electrolyte being able to be used in conjunction with bare cathode active materials as opposed to coated cathode active materials and its low electronic conductivity. Alternative cheaper chloride solid electrolyte compositions with lower, but still impressive, ionic conductivity can be found with an Li_{2}ZrCl_{6} solid electrolyte. This particular chloride solid electrolyte maintains a high room temperature ionic conductivity (0.81 mS cm^{−1}), deformability, and has a high humidity tolerance.

=== Perovskite ===
Perovskite materials have potential for application in the field of electrochemical energy storage as well as energy conversion. It has been undergoing research for use in solar cells, and energy storage. Its usage faces challenges in stability and scalability. Its general formula is ABX3. In ABX3, the B ion is surrounded by the X ion octahedron and the A ion is located in the center of the cube.

== Uses ==
Solid-state batteries are potentially useful in pacemakers, RFIDs, wearable devices, and electric vehicles.

=== Electric vehicles ===
Hybrid and plug-in electric vehicles have used a variety of battery technologies, including lead–acid, nickel–metal hydride (NiMH), lithium ion (Li-ion) and electric double-layer capacitor (or ultracapacitor), with Li-ion batteries dominating the market due to their superior energy density. Solid state batteries are desirable due to their lighter weight and higher energy density compared to batteries with liquid electrolytes, which can potentially increase a vehicle's range, reduce cost, and reduce curb weight, all of which are major challenges with current electric vehicles.

Honda stated in 2022 that it planned to start operation of a demonstration line for the production of all-solid-state batteries in early 2024, and Nissan announced that, by FY2028, it aims to launch an electric vehicle with all-solid-state batteries that are to be developed in-house.

In June 2023, Toyota updated its strategy for battery electric vehicles, announcing that it will not use commercial solid-state batteries until at least 2027.

In January 2022, Mercedes-Benz invested significantly in ProLogium to codevelop next gen ceramic solid-state battery cell. The company also collaborates on solid-state technology and plans to construct eight gigafactories with partners. By December 2023, Mercedes-Benz had invested in US-based Factorial Energy, advancing its solid-state battery initiatives.

=== Wearables ===
The characteristics of high energy density and keeping high performance even in harsh environments are expected in realization of new wearable devices that are smaller and more reliable than ever.

=== Equipment in space ===
In March 2021, industrial manufacturer Hitachi Zosen Corporation announced a solid-state battery they claimed has one of the highest capacities in the industry and has a wider operating temperature range, potentially suitable for harsh environments like space. A test mission was launched in February 2022, and in August, Japan Aerospace Exploration Agency (JAXA) announced the solid-state batteries had properly operated in space, powering camera equipment in the Japanese Experiment Module Kibō on the International Space Station (ISS).

=== Drones ===
Solid-state batteries being lighter weight and more powerful than traditional lithium-ion batteries, it is reasonable that commercial drones would benefit from them. Vayu Aerospace, a drone manufacturer and designer, noted an increased flight time after they incorporated them into their G1 long flight drone. Another advantage of drones is that all solid battery can be charged quickly. In September 2023, Panasonic announced a prototype all-solid-state battery that can be charged from 10% to 80% in 3 minutes.

=== Industrial machinery ===
All-solid-state batteries have long lifespans and excellent heat resistance. Accordingly, they are expected to be used in harsh environments. Production of Maxell's all-solid-state batteries for use in industrial machinery has already begun.

=== Portable solar generators ===
In 2023, Yoshino become the first producer of solid-state portable solar generators, 2.5 times higher energy density, double rated and surge AC output wattage of non-solid state lithium (NMC, LFP) generators.

== Challenges ==
=== Cost of thin-film ===
Thin-film solid-state batteries are expensive to make and employ manufacturing processes thought to be difficult to scale, requiring expensive vacuum deposition equipment. As a result, costs for thin-film solid-state batteries become prohibitive in consumer-based applications. It was estimated in 2012 that, based on then-current technology, a 20 Ah solid-state battery cell would cost US$100,000, and a high-range electric car would require between 800 and 1,000 of such cells. Likewise, cost has impeded the adoption of thin-film solid-state batteries in other areas, such as smartphones.

=== Temperature and pressure sensitivity ===
Low temperature operations may be challenging. Solid-state batteries historically have had poor performance.

Solid-state batteries with ceramic electrolytes require high pressure to maintain contact with the electrodes. Solid-state batteries with ceramic separators may break from mechanical stress.

In November 2022, Japanese research group, consisting of Kyoto University, Tottori University and Sumitomo Chemical, announced that they have managed to operate solid-state batteries stably without applying pressure with 230 Wh/kg capacity by using copolymerized new materials for electrolyte.

In June 2023, Japanese research group of the Graduate School of Engineering at Osaka Metropolitan University announced that they have succeeded in stabilizing the high-temperature phase of Li_{3}PS_{4} (α-Li_{3}PS_{4}) at room temperature. This was accomplished via rapid heating to crystallize the Li_{3}PS_{4} glass.

=== Interfacial resistance ===
High interfacial resistance between a cathode and solid electrolyte has been a long-standing problem for all-solid-state batteries. Traditional densification techniques used in Li-ion battery production—such as hot-rolling and uniaxial pressing—produce a non-uniform pressure field and therefore non-uniform closure of porosity in the solid electrolyte. In contrast, modern equipment designed specifically for solid-state batteries, such as warm isostatic pressing, applies a nearly uniform pressure throughout the solid electrolyte, leading to more homogeneous densification and, as a consequence, reduced bulk and grain boundary resistivity.

To better understand degradation mechanisms at the interfaces and within materials, advanced nanoscale imaging techniques are often employed. Atomic force microscopy (AFM) enables topographical mapping of solid-state battery materials at the nanometer scale, revealing microstructural features such as cracks, dendrite initiation sites, or interphase evolution. Kelvin probe force microscopy (KPFM) extends this capability by mapping surface potential distributions, making it particularly useful for visualizing local charge accumulation and interfacial instabilities. Additionally, Conductive AFM (C-AFM) is used to map nanoscale electrical conductivity across electrodes and solid electrolytes, helping to identify failure zones and to evaluate the uniformity of ionic pathways.

=== Interfacial instability ===
The interfacial instability of the electrode-electrolyte has always been a serious problem in solid-state batteries. After solid-state electrolyte contacts with the electrode, the chemical and/or electrochemical side reactions at the interface usually produce a passivated interface, which impedes the diffusion of Li^{+} across the electrode-SSE interface. Upon high-voltage cycling, some SSEs may undergo oxidative degradation.

=== Dendrites ===
Lithium metal dendrite from the anode piercing through the separator and growing towards the cathode.

Solid lithium (Li) metal anodes in solid-state batteries are replacement candidates in lithium-ion batteries for higher energy densities, safety, and faster recharging times. Such anodes tend to suffer from the formation and the growth of Li dendrites, non-uniform metal growths which penetrate the electrolyte leading to electrical short circuits. This shorting leads to energy discharge, overheating, and sometimes fires or explosions due to thermal runaway. Li dendrites reduce coulombic efficiency.

The exact mechanisms of dendrite growth remain a subject of research. Studies of metal dendrite growth in solid electrolytes began with research of molten sodium / sodium – β – alumina / sulfur cells at elevated temperature. In these systems, dendrites sometimes grow as a result of micro-crack extension due to the presence of plating-induced pressure at the sodium / solid electrolyte interface. However, dendrite growth may also occur due to chemical degradation of the solid electrolyte. The uneven densification of hot-rolling of the solid electrode, due to the non-uniform applied pressure, results in crack-initiation points for dendrite formation.

In Li-ion solid electrolytes apparently stable to Li metal, as visualized and measured using photoelasticity experiments, dendrites propagate primarily due to pressure build up at the electrode / solid electrolyte interface, leading to crack extension. Meanwhile, for solid electrolytes which are chemically unstable against their respective metal, interphase growth and eventual cracking often prevents dendrites from forming.

Dendrite growth in solid-state Li-ion cells can be mitigated by operating the cells at elevated temperature thereby deflecting dendrites and delaying dendrite induced short-circuiting. Aluminum-containing electronic rectifying interphases between the solid-state electrolyte and the lithium metal anode have also been shown to be effective in preventing dendrite growth.

=== Mechanical failure ===
A common failure mechanism in solid-state batteries is mechanical failure through volume changes in the anode and cathode during charge and discharge due to the addition and removal of Li-ions from the host structures.

==== Cathode ====
Cathodes will typically consist of active cathode particles mixed with SSE particles to assist with ion conduction. As the battery charges/discharges, the cathode particles change in volume typically on the order of a few percent. This volume change leads to the formation of interparticle voids which worsens contact between the cathode and SSE particles, resulting in a significant loss of capacity due to the restriction in ion transport.

One proposed solution to this issue is to take advantage of the anisotropy of volume change in the cathode particles. As many cathode materials experience volume changes only along certain crystallographic directions, if the secondary cathode particles are grown along a crystallographic direction which does not expand greatly with charge/discharge, then the change in volume of the particles can be minimized. Another proposed solution is to mix different cathode materials which have opposite expansion trends in the proper ratio such that the net volume change of the cathode is zero. For instance, LiCoO_{2} (LCO) and LiNi_{0.9}Mn_{0.05}Co_{0.05}O_{2} (NMC) are two well-known cathode materials for Li-ion batteries. LCO has been shown to undergo volume expansion when discharged while NMC has been shown to undergo volume contraction when discharged. Thus, a composite cathode of LCO and NMC at the correct ratio could undergo minimal volume change under discharge as the contraction of NMC is compensated by the expansion of LCO.

==== Anode ====
Ideally a solid-state battery would use a pure lithium metal anode due to its high energy capacity. However, lithium undergoes a large increase of volume during charge at around 5 μm per 1 mAh/cm^{2} of plated Li. For electrolytes with a porous microstructure, this expansion leads to an increase in pressure which can lead to creep of Li metal through the electrolyte pores and short of the cell. Lithium metal has a relatively low melting point of 453K and a low activation energy for self-diffusion of 50 kJ/mol, indicating its high propensity to significantly creep at room temperature. It has been shown that at room temperature lithium undergoes power-law creep where the temperature is high enough relative to the melting point that dislocations in the metal can climb out of their glide plane to avoid obstacles. The creep stress under power-law creep is given by:

$\sigma_{creep} = \left(\frac{\dot{\varepsilon}}{A_c}\right)^{1/m}\exp{\left(\frac{Q_c}{mRT}\right)}$

Where $R$ is the gas constant, $T$ is temperature, $\dot{\varepsilon}$ is the uniaxial strain rate, $\sigma_{creep}$ is the creep stress, and for lithium metal $m = 6.6$, $Q_c = 37\,\mathrm{kJ} \cdot \mathrm{mol}^{-1}$, $A_c^{-1/m}=3\times 10^5\,\mathrm{Pa} \cdot \mathrm{s}^{-1}$.

For lithium metal to be used as an anode, great care must be taken to minimize the cell pressure to relatively low values on the order of its yield stress of 0.8 MPa. The normal operating cell pressure for lithium metal anode is anywhere from 1-7 MPa. Some possible strategies to minimize stress on the lithium metal are to use cells with springs of a chosen spring constant or controlled pressurization of the entire cell. Another strategy may be to sacrifice some energy capacity and use a lithium metal alloy anode which typically has a higher melting temperature than pure lithium metal, resulting in a lower propensity to creep. While these alloys do expand quite a bit when lithiated, often to a greater degree than lithium metal, they also possess improved mechanical properties allowing them to operate at pressures around 50 MPa. This higher cell pressure also has the added benefit of possibly mitigating void formation in the cathode.

== Advantages ==
=== Improved energy density ===
Solid-state batteries offer the potential for significantly higher energy densities compared to traditional lithium-ion batteries. This is largely due to the use of lithium metal anodes, which have a much higher charge capacity than the graphite anodes used in lithium-ion batteries. At a cell level, lithium-ion energy densities are generally below 300Wh/kg while solid-state battery energy densities are able to exceed 350 Wh/kg. This energy density boost is especially beneficial for applications requiring longer-lasting and more compact batteries such as electric vehicles.

=== Increase of safety and thermal stability ===
One significant advantage of solid-state batteries is their improved safety profile. Solid electrolytes greatly reduce the risk of thermal runaway—a primary cause of battery fires. Because most solid electrolytes are nonflammable, solid-state batteries have a much lower fire risk and do not require as many safety systems, which can further increase energy density at the cell pack level. Studies have shown that heat generation during thermal runaway is only about 20-30% of what is observed in conventional batteries with liquid electrolytes.

=== Expanded temperature and voltage operating ranges ===
Solid electrolytes enable a broader range of operating temperatures and voltages, which is crucial for high performance applications. SSBs can operate at temperatures above 60 °C, where traditional are generally only able to operate from -20 to 60 °C.

Solid state batteries also support high-voltage cathode chemistries such as lithium nickel manganese oxide, lithium nickel phosphate, and lithium cobalt phosphate. This allows voltages to potentially exceed 5 V (vs. a Li/Li^{+} reference electrode) while traditional cathode chemistries in lithium-ion batteries are unable to exceed 4.5V (vs. a Li/Li^{+} reference electrode).

=== Faster charging and improved space efficiency ===
The solid electrolyte and lithium metal anode combination enables faster ion transfer, which can reduce charging times compared to lithium-ion batteries. Furthermore, bipolar stacking of cells can be incorporated, allowing for reduced cell size and more compact battery packs. This allows for improved overall energy efficiency and enables design flexibility for various applications.

=== Low Self Discharge Rate ===
Solid electrolyte stability reduces the rate at which solid-state batteries discharge when being stored.

== Thin-film solid-state batteries ==
=== Background ===
The earliest thin-film solid-state batteries is found by Keiichi Kanehori in 1986, which is based on the Li electrolyte. The technology was insufficient to power larger electronic devices so it was not fully developed. "Polyamorphism" exists besides crystalline states for thin-film Li-garnet solid-state batteries in 2018, Moran demonstrated that ample can manufacture ceramic films with the desired size range of 1–20 μm in 2021.

=== Structure ===
Anode materials: Lithium is favored because of its storage properties, alloys of Al, Si and Sn are also suitable as anodes.

Cathode materials: require having light weight, good cyclical capacity and high energy density. They usually include LiCoO_{2}, LiFePO_{4}, TiS_{2}, V_{2}O_{5} and LiMnO_{2}.

=== Preparation techniques ===
Some methods are listed below.

- Physical methods:
  1. Magnetron sputtering (MS) is one of the most widely used processes for thin-film manufacturing, which is based on physical vapor deposition.
  2. Ion-beam deposition (IBD) is similar to the first method, however, bias is not applied and plasma doesn't occur between the target and the substrate in this process.
  3. Pulsed laser deposition (PLD), laser used in this method has a high power pulses up to about 10^{8} W cm^{−2}.
  4. Vacuum evaporation (VE) is a method to prepare alpha-Si thin films. During this process, Si evaporates and deposits on a metallic substrate.
- Chemical methods:
  1. Electrodeposition (ED) is for manufacturing Si films, which is convenient and economically viable technique.
  2. Chemical vapor deposition (CVD) is a deposition technique allowing to make thin films with a high quality and purity.
  3. Glow discharge plasma deposition (GDPD) is a mixed physicochemical process. In this process, synthesis temperature has been increased to decrease the extra hydrogen content in the films.

=== Development of thin-film system ===
- Lithium–oxygen and nitrogen-based polymer thin-film electrolytes has got fully used in solid-state batteries.
- Non-Li based thin-film solid-state batteries have been studied, such as Ag-doped germanium chalcogenide thin-film solid-state electrolyte system. Barium-doped thin-film system has also been studied, which thickness can be 2 μm at least. In addition, Ni can also be a component in thin film.
- There are also other methods to fabricate the electrolytes for thin-film solid-state batteries, which are 1.electrostatic-spray deposition technique, 2. DSM-Soulfill process and 3. Using MoO_{3} nanobelts to improve the performance of lithium-based thin-film solid-state batteries.

=== Advantages ===
- Compared with other batteries, the thin-film batteries have both high gravimetric as well as volumetric energy densities. These are important indicators to measure battery performance of energy stored.
- In addition to high energy density, thin-film solid-state batteries have long lifetime, outstanding flexibility and low weight. These properties make thin-film solid-state batteries suitable for use in various fields such as electric vehicles, military facilities and medical devices.

=== Challenges ===
- Its performance and efficiency are constrained by the nature of its geometry. The current drawn from a thin-film battery largely depends on the geometry and interface contacts of the electrolyte/cathode and the electrolyte/anode interfaces
- Low thickness of the electrolyte and the interfacial resistance at the electrode and electrolyte interface affect the output and integration of thin-film systems.
- During the charging-discharging process, considerable change of volumetric makes the loss of material.

== Innovation and IP protection ==
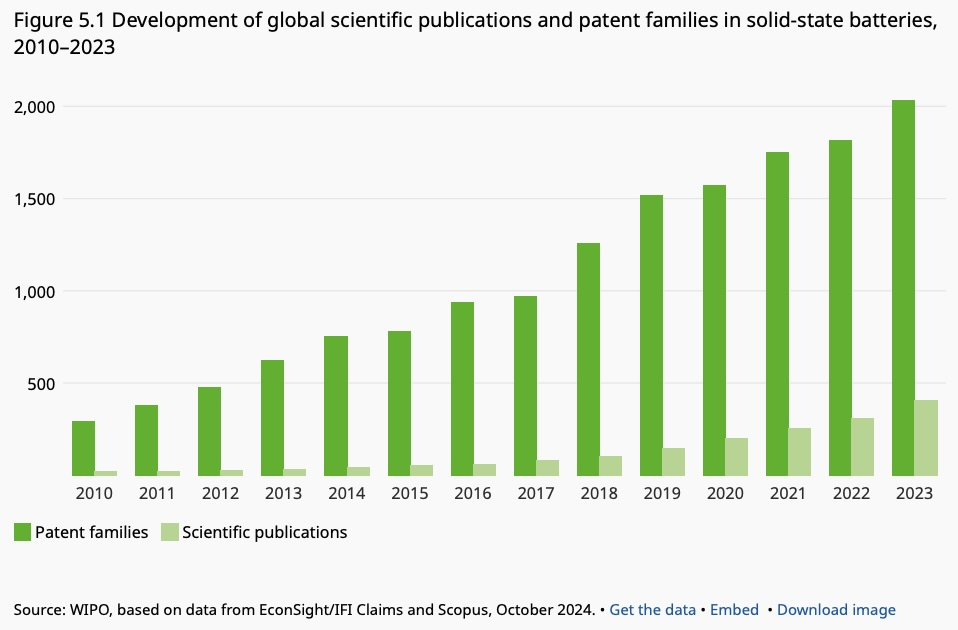
Research and patenting activities in solid-state batteries have grown significantly and steadily between 2010 and 2023.

The patent landscape for solid-state batteries has been evolving since 2010, reflecting the global race to develop safer and more efficient energy storage solutions. Major corporations, particularly in the automotive and electronics sectors, have been actively filing patents to secure the Intellectual property of their innovations in this field. Toyota is the top company in terms of granted patent rights, followed by LG, Samsung, Murata and Panasonic. Japanese automaker Toyota was granted 8274 solid-battery patents between 2020 and 2023.

According to 2024 WIPO Technology trends future of transportation report, research and patenting activities in solid-state batteries have grown significantly between 2010 and 2023, and are an important niche within the broader field of battery technologies. Patent registrations grew at a CAGR of 22% from 2017 to 2024, resulting in 2110 patents related to the combination of solid-state batteries and isostatic pressure as of November 2025.

Isostatic pressing has gained traction as an improved solid electrolyte production process.

== See also ==
- Anode-free battery
- Solid-state electrolyte
- Divalent
- Fast ion conductor
- Ionic conductivity
- Ionic crystal
- John B. Goodenough
- List of battery types
- Lithium–air battery
- Lithium iron phosphate battery
- Separator (electricity)
- Supercapacitor
- Thin-film lithium-ion battery
- Silicon battery
