= The Bike Shed Motorcycle Club =

Motorcycle club based in London

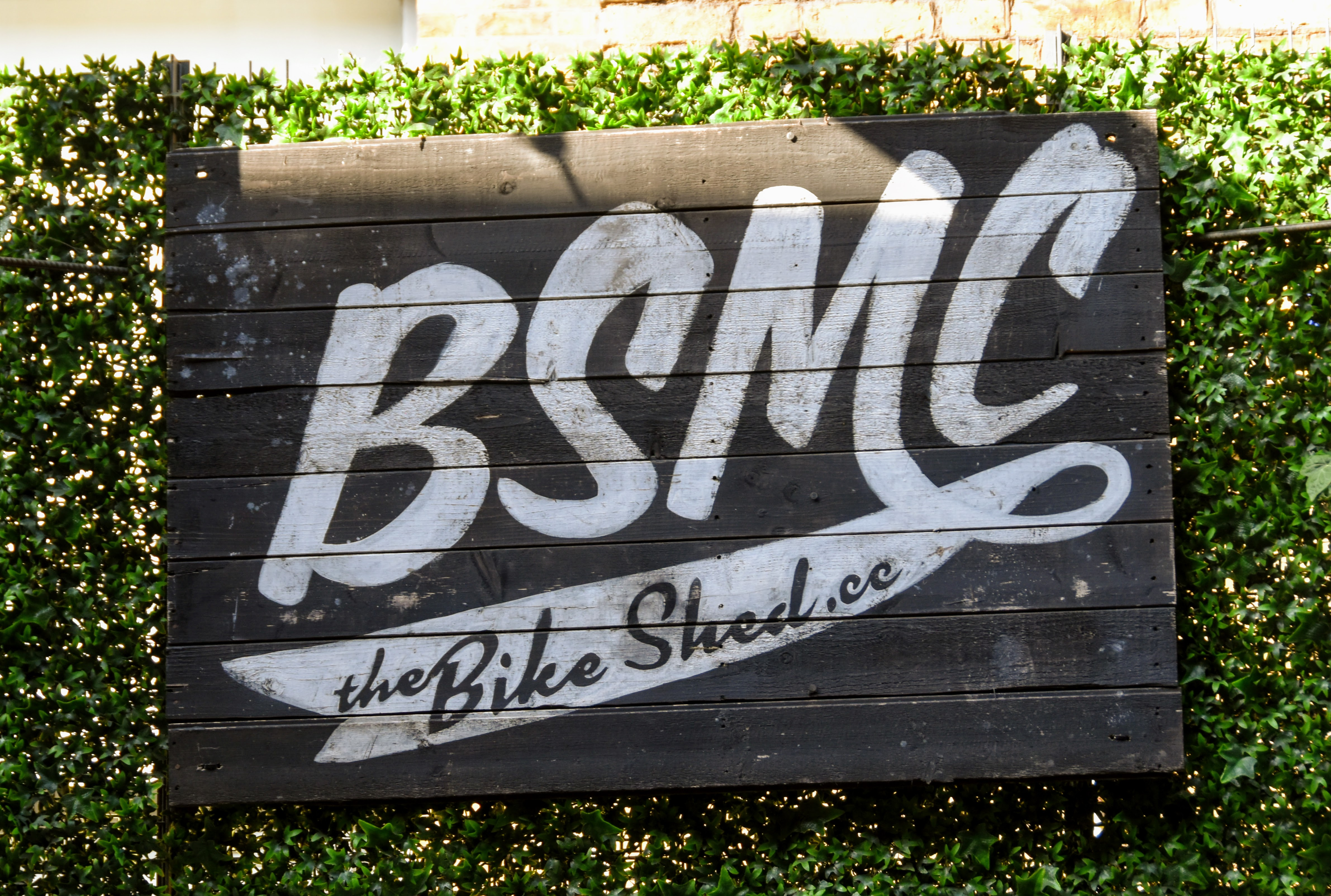
- Location: 384 Old St, Shoreditch, London, England
- Key people: Anthony 'Dutch' van Someren, Vikki
- Website: Bike Shed Motorcycle Club

The Bike Shed Motorcycle Club is a motorcycle-themed private members club in Shoreditch, London with a branch in Los Angeles. The club was founded by Anthony "Dutch" van Someren. The Bike Shed hosts an annual exhibition of custom motorcycles in Tobacco Dock, Wapping.

== London ==
The founder, Van Someren ran a motorcycle news blog aggregator under the domain name BikeShedMotorcycleClub.com prior to founding the Shoreditch-based Club. The Bike Shed shows were founded in response to the perceived poor quality of British motorcycle exhibitions. Van Someren developed the concept of the private member's club after their second show was well received.

Someren envisaged Bike Shed as a "Soho House for Bikers", attracting a younger demographic than traditional motorcycle-friendly venues. Proposals to open the facility were initially opposed by the Shoreditch Community Association and the Shoreditch Town Hall Trust. The club in Shoreditch was opened in November 2015 in three railway arches adjacent to Old Street.

The Old Street venue was opened with the support of British TV presenter Charley Boorman, and is now considered to be one of the UK's best motorcycling social venues. Despite objections, Hackney Council granted the club a license to serve alcoholic drinks to members until midnight. In 2019 the club installed the UK's first motorcycle-only recharging points.

The club's founders were awarded the British Empire Medal for their work organizing a volunteer motorcycle courier-style service in which its members helped deliver food and medical supplies to patients at home.

== Los Angeles ==
The Los Angeles facility, was opened in Autumn 2020 in the city's Arts District. The facility includes a restaurant, cafe, bar and lounge, a barbershop, tattoo studio, events and retails space. The Bike Shed hosted retail showrooms for Verge Motorcycles.

== Exhibitions ==
The annual Bike Shed Motorcycle Show takes place at Tobacco Dock in Wapping. It is reported to be the UK's largest exhibition of custom motorcycles. In 2018 the exhibition featured 230 motorcycles including track-bikes and custom-built machines.

== Festival ==
The first Bike Shed Festival took place in October 2019, at Lydden Hill Race Circuit, billed as a day to introduce new motorcyclists to track riding.
