= Thin-film lithium-ion battery =

Type of battery

The thin-film lithium-ion battery is a form of solid-state battery. Its development is motivated by the prospect of combining the advantages of solid-state batteries with the advantages of thin-film manufacturing processes.

Thin-film construction could lead to improvements in specific energy, energy density, and power density on top of the gains from using a solid electrolyte. It allows for flexible cells only a few microns thick. It may also reduce manufacturing costs from scalable roll-to-roll processing and even allow for the use of cheap materials.

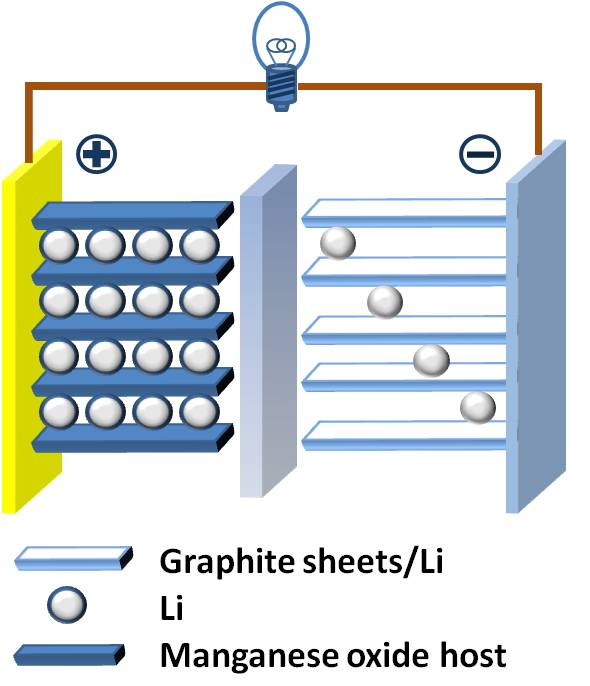
Lithium-ion battery

== Background ==
Lithium-ion batteries store chemical energy in reactive chemicals at the anodes and cathodes of a cell. Typically, anodes and cathodes exchange lithium (Li+) ions through a fluid electrolyte that passes through a porous separator which prevents direct contact between the anode and cathode. Such contact would lead to an internal short circuit and a potentially hazardous uncontrolled reaction. Electric current is usually carried by conductive collectors at the anodes and cathodes to and from the negative and positive terminals of the cell (respectively).

In a thin-film lithium battery the electrolyte is solid and the other components are deposited in layers on a substrate. In some designs, the solid electrolyte also serves as a separator.

== Components of thin film battery ==
=== Cathode materials ===
Cathode materials in thin-film lithium-ion batteries are the same as in classical lithium-ion batteries. They are normally metal oxides that are deposited as a film by various methods.

Metal oxide materials are shown below as well as their relative specific capacities (Λ), open circuit voltages (V_{oc}), and energy densities (D_{E}).

Material Ratings
	Λ(Ah/kg)	V_{OC}(V)	D_{E}(Wh/kg)
LiCoO_{2}	145	4	580
LiMn_{2}O_{4}	148	4	592
LiFePO_{4}	170	3.4	578

Energy Density
D_{E} = Λ V_{OC}
Λ: capacity (mAh/g)
V_{OC}: Open circuit potential

=== Deposition methods for cathode materials ===
There are various methods being used to deposit thin-film cathode materials onto the current collector.

==== Pulsed laser deposition ====
In pulsed laser deposition, materials are fabricated by controlling parameters such as laser energy and fluence, substrate temperature, background pressure, and target-substrate distance.

==== Magnetron sputtering ====
In magnetron sputtering the substrate is cooled for deposition.

==== Chemical vapor deposition ====
In chemical vapor deposition, volatile precursor materials are deposited onto a substrate material.

==== Sol-gel processing ====
Sol-gel processing allows for homogeneous mixing of precursor materials at the atomic level.

=== Electrolyte ===
The greatest difference between classical lithium-ion batteries and thin, flexible, lithium-ion batteries is in the electrolyte material used. Progress in lithium-ion batteries relies as much on improvements in the electrolyte as it does in the electrode materials, as the electrolyte plays a major role in safe battery operation. The concept of thin-film lithium-ion batteries was increasingly motivated by manufacturing advantages presented by the polymer technology for their use as electrolytes. LiPON, lithium phosphorus oxynitride, is an amorphous glassy material used as an electrolyte material in thin-film flexible batteries. Layers of LiPON are deposited over the cathode material at ambient temperatures by RF magnetron sputtering. This forms the solid electrolyte used for ion conduction between anode and cathode. LiBON, lithium boron oxynitride, is another amorphous glassy material used as a solid electrolyte material in thin-film flexible batteries. Solid polymer electrolytes offer several advantages in comparison to a classical liquid lithium-ion battery. Rather than having separate components of electrolyte, binder, and separator, these solid electrolytes can act as all three. This increases the overall energy density of the assembled battery because the constituents of the entire cell are more tightly packed.

=== Separator material ===
Separator materials in lithium-ion batteries must not block the transport of lithium ions while preventing the physical contact of the anode and cathode materials, e.g. short-circuiting. In a liquid cell, this separator would be a porous glass or polymer mesh that allows ion transport via the liquid electrolyte through the pores, but keeps the electrodes from contacting and shorting. However, in a thin-film battery the electrolyte is a solid, which conveniently satisfies both the ion transportation and the physical separation requirements without the need for a dedicated separator.

=== Current collector ===
Current collectors in thin-film batteries must be flexible, have high surface area, and be cost-effective. Silver nanowires with improved surface area and loading weight have been shown to work as a current collector in these battery systems, but still are not as cost-effective as desired. Extending graphite technology to lithium-ion batteries, solution processed carbon nanotubes (CNT) films are being looked into for use as both the current collector and anode material. CNTs have the ability to intercalate lithium and maintain high operating voltages, all with low mass loading and flexibility.

== Advantages and challenges ==
Thin-film lithium-ion batteries offer improved performance by having a higher average output voltage, lighter weights thus higher energy density (3x), and longer cycling life (1200 cycles without degradation) and can work in a wider range of temperatures (between -20 and 60 °C)than typical rechargeable lithium-ion batteries.

Li-ion transfer cells are the most promising systems for satisfying the demand of high specific energy and high power and would be cheaper to manufacture.

In the thin-film lithium-ion battery, both electrodes are capable of reversible lithium insertion, thus forming a Li-ion transfer cell. In order to construct a thin-film battery it is necessary to fabricate all the battery components, as an anode, a solid electrolyte, a cathode and current leads into multi-layered thin films by suitable technologies.

In a thin-film-based system, the electrolyte is normally a solid electrolyte, capable of conforming to the shape of the battery. This is in contrast to classical lithium-ion batteries, which normally have liquid electrolyte material. Liquid electrolytes can be challenging to utilize if they are not compatible with the separator. Also liquid electrolytes in general call for an increase in the overall volume of the battery, which is not ideal for designing a system that has high energy density. Additionally, in a thin-film flexible Li-ion battery, the electrolyte, which is normally polymer-based, can act as the electrolyte, separator, and binder material. This provides the ability to have flexible systems since the issue of electrolyte leakage is circumvented. Finally, solid systems can be packed together tightly which affords an increase in energy density when compared to classical liquid lithium-ion batteries.

Separator materials in lithium-ion batteries must have the ability to transport ions through their porous membranes while maintaining a physical separation between the anode and cathode materials in order to prevent short-circuiting. Furthermore, the separator must be resistant to degradation during the battery’s operation. In a thin-film Li-ion battery, the separator must be a thin and flexible solid. Typically today, this material is a polymer-based material. Since thin-film batteries are made of all solid materials, allows one to use simpler separator materials in these systems such as Xerox paper rather than in liquid-based Li-ion batteries.

== Scientific development ==
Development of thin solid-state batteries allows for roll to roll type production of batteries to decrease production costs. Solid-state batteries can also afford increased energy density due to decrease in overall device weight, while the flexible nature allows for novel battery design and easier incorporation into electronics. Development is still required in cathode materials which will resist capacity reduction due to cycling.

Prior Technology	Replacement Technology	Result
Solution based electrolyte	Solid-state electrolyte	Increased safety and cycle life
Polymer separators	Paper separator	Decreased cost increased rate of ion conduction
Metallic current collectors	Carbon nanotube current collectors	Decreased device weight, increased energy density
Graphite anode	Carbon nanotube anode	Decreased device complexity

== Makers ==
- Murata Manufacturing

== Applications ==
The advancements made to the thin-film lithium-ion battery have allowed for many potential applications. The majority of these applications are aimed at improving the currently available consumer and medical products. Thin-film lithium-ion batteries can be used to make thinner portable electronics, because the thickness of the battery required to operate the device can be reduced greatly. These batteries have the ability to be an integral part of implantable medical devices, such as defibrillators and neural stimulators, "smart" cards, radio frequency identification tags and wireless sensors. They can also serve as a way to store energy collected from solar cells or other harvesting devices. Each of these applications is possible because of the flexibility in the size and shape of the batteries. The size of these devices does not have to revolve around the size of the space needed for the battery anymore. The thin-film batteries can be attached to the inside of the casing or in some other convenient way. There are many opportunities in which to use this type of batteries.

=== Renewable energy storage devices ===
The thin-film lithium-ion battery can serve as a storage device for the energy collected from renewable sources with a variable generation rate, such as a solar cell or wind turbine. These batteries can be made to have a low self discharge rate, which means that these batteries can be stored for long periods of time without a major loss of the energy that was used to charge it. These fully charged batteries could then be used to power some or all of the other potential applications listed below, or provide more reliable power to an electric grid for general use.

=== Smart cards ===
Smart cards have the same size as a credit card, but they contain a microchip that can be used to access information, give authorization, or process an application. These cards can go through harsh production conditions, with temperatures in the range of 130 to 150 °C, in order to complete the high temperature, high pressure lamination processes. These conditions can cause other batteries to fail because of degassing or degradation of organic components within the battery. Thin-film lithium-ion batteries have been shown to withstand temperatures of -40 to 150 °C. This use of thin-film lithium-ion batteries is hopeful for other extreme temperature applications.

=== Radio frequency identification tags ===
Radio-frequency identification tags can be used in many different applications. These tags can be used in packaging, inventory control, used to verify authenticity and even allow or deny access to something. These ID tags can even have other integrated sensors to allow for the physical environment to be monitored, such as temperature or shock during travel or shipping. Also, the distance required to read the information in the tag depends on the strength of the battery. The farther away you want to be able to read the information, the stronger the output will have to be and thus the greater the power supply to accomplish this output. As these tags get more and more complex, the battery requirements will need to keep up. Thin-film lithium-ion batteries have shown that they can fit into the designs of the tags because of the flexibility of the battery in size and shape and are sufficiently powerful enough to accomplish the goals of the tag. Low cost production methods, like roll to roll lamination, of these batteries may even allow for this kind of radio frequency identification technology to be implemented in disposable applications.

=== Implantable medical devices ===
Thin films of LiCoO_{2} have been synthesized in which the strongest X-ray reflection is either weak or missing, indicating a high degree of preferred orientation. Thin-film solid-state batteries with these textured cathode films can deliver practical capacities at high current densities. For example, for one of the cells 70% of the maximum capacity between 4.2 V and 3 V (approximately 0.2 mAh/cm^{2}) was delivered at a current of 2 mA/cm^{2}. When cycled at rates of 0.1 mA/cm^{2}, the capacity loss was 0.001%/cycle or less. The reliability and performance of Li LiCoO_{2} thin-film batteries make them attractive for application in implantable devices such as neural stimulators, pacemakers, and defibrillators.

Implantable medical devices require batteries that can deliver a steady, reliable power source for as long as possible. These applications call for a battery that has a low self-discharge rate, for when it’s not in use, and a high power rate, for when it needs to be used, especially in the case of an implantable defibrillator. Also, users of the product will want a battery that can go through many cycles, so these devices will not have to be replaced or serviced often. Thin-film lithium-ion batteries have the ability to meet these requirements. The advancement from a liquid to a solid electrolyte has allowed these batteries to take almost any shape without the worry of leaking, and it has been shown that certain types of thin-film rechargeable lithium batteries can last for around 50,000 cycles. Another advantage to these thin-film batteries is that they can be arranged in series to give a larger voltage equal to the sum of the individual battery voltages. This fact can be used in reducing the "footprint" of the battery, or the size of the space needed for the battery, in the design of a device.

=== Wireless sensors ===
Wireless sensors need to be in use for the duration of their application, whether that may be in package shipping or in the detection of some unwanted compound, or controlling inventory in a warehouse. If the wireless sensor cannot transmit its data due to low or no battery power, the consequences could potentially be severe based on the application. Also, the wireless sensor must be adaptable to each application. Therefore the battery must be able to fit within the designed sensor. This means that the desired battery for these devices must be long-lasting, size specific, low cost, if they are going to be used in disposable technologies, and must meet the requirements of the data collection and transmission processes. Once again, thin-film lithium-ion batteries have shown the ability to meet all of these requirements.

== See also ==
- List of battery types
- Lithium-ion battery
