= Dry process =

In process engineering Dry process may refer to:

- Dry process (cement) used in cement manufacture using Cement kilns
- Dry spinning process in fibre spinning
- Dry process in Coffee production
- Dry process in Coconut oil production
- Dry process in the manufacture of Separators for electrochemical cells
