= ProLogium =

Taiwanese solid-state battery manufacturer

- Type: Private
- Industry: Automotive lithium battery, energy storage
- Founded: 2006
- Founder: Vincent Yang
- Headquarters: Taoyuan, Taiwan
- Products: Solid-state battery
- Number of employees: 800 (Taoyuan only)
- Website: https://www.prologium.com/

Founded in 2006, ProLogium Technology (Traditional Chinese: 輝能科技) is a Taiwanese solid-state battery developer and manufacturer.

== History ==
ProLogium Technologies was established in 2006. Its initial sales were of solid-state batteries to automakers for testing and product development purposes.

In May 2023, ProLogium announced that it would open a 5.2 billion euro primary international production center in Dunkirk at a ceremony headlined by French President Emmanuel Macron. ProLogium had also seriously explored locating the factory in Germany or the Netherlands. ProLogium executives said that France had beaten out Germany and the Netherlands by improving the deal they offered, including by promising low priced power. Significant lobbying by the French side also came into play. All of the contenders had offered significant incentive packages including large tax credits. The ability to reliably source zero-carbon electricity was also a concern.

In July 2022, ProLogium activated its expansion plan in Europe. By September 2022 they were said to have reduced their search to a shortlist including Germany, France, Germany, the United Kingdom, and Poland.

In February 2022, American business news website Insider reported on 15 notable unicorn companies in the global electric vehicle industry selected by Pitchbook, a financial research company, and ProLogium was included on the list.

== Partnership ==
Mercedes-Benz identifies ProLogium as one of its strategic partners for solid-state battery development. In 2026, Mercedes-Benz stated that it was conducting extensive testing of ProLogium’s fourth-generation (Gen4) cell technology, focusing on performance, safety, and thermal properties, in order to assess its potential for future series production.

In June 2026, ProLogium and Elysian Aircraft BV signed a memorandum of understanding to assess the potential application of next-generation batteries in all-electric aircraft. The initial scope included evaluation of existing battery platforms for aircraft systems and discussion of battery designs tailored to aviation requirements.

In June 2026, ProLogium and OPmobility signed a memorandum of understanding to explore the joint development and integration of ProLogium’s solid-state battery cells into battery modules and packs for electric vehicles. Under the agreement, ProLogium was to supply cells for electrical performance testing, while OPmobility was responsible for designing, developing, and manufacturing the battery modules.The companies stated that their shared objective was to develop a battery-module solution that could be adopted by original equipment manufacturers for future EV platforms.

In March 2022, ProLogium and Gogoro released a prototype solid-state lithium ceramic battery for Gogoro's scooter charging network.

In January 2022, Mercedes-Benz and ProLogium signed a technology cooperation agreement to develop next-generation solid-state battery cells. Under the agreement, Mercedes-Benz invested in ProLogium and took a seat on its board of directors. The companies stated that the first Mercedes-Benz test vehicles equipped with cells co-developed with ProLogium were expected to be introduced in subsequent years.

In March 2021, ProLogium signed an MOU with Vietnamese car OEM Vinfast. According to the MOU, ProLogium and Vinfast will establish a joint venture to produce solid-state batteries for electric cars in Vietnam.

In 2019 ProLogium signed cooperation agreements with several Chinese electric vehicle manufacturers, including NIO, AiWAYS, and Enovate Motors.

== Shareholders ==
In May 2026, ProLogium entered into a definitive business-combination agreement with Translational Development Acquisition Corp. (TDAC), a Nasdaq-listed SPAC. The proposed transaction valued ProLogium at approximately US$3.8 billion and, subject to shareholder approval, regulatory approvals and closing conditions, was expected to list the combined company on Nasdaq under the ticker symbol PRLG.

Both Mercedes-Benz and VinFast own a portion of ProLogium. As of May 2023 ProLogium had raised US$700 million from investors. In return for their significant investment Mercedes-Benz received a seat on ProLogium's board of directors.

In 2023 Yang stated his intent to eventually take the company public via an Initial public offering (IPO).

In 2022 POSCO has invested an undisclosed amount in ProLogium. Meanwhile, POSCO and ProLogium has signed an agreement on the joint development of components for ProLogium's solid-state batteries.

In 2021 ProLogium conducted a $326 million funding round with buy-in from Primavera Capital Group, and SoftBank China Venture Capital among others which placed the company's total valuation somewhere between $2-$3 billion.

== Products ==
ProLogium primarily makes solid-state batteries.

== Certification ==
In April 2023, ProLogium announced that it had received ISO 9001 and IATF 16949 quality-management-system certifications from SGS. IATF 16949 is an automotive-industry quality-management standard; the certification covered the company’s research, development, manufacturing, and quality-management systems.

== Operations ==
ProLogium is headquartered in Taoyuan, Taiwan, with subsidiaries in Singapore and Beijin.

The company is building a 1-2GWh capacity gigafactory in Taiwan. In 2024 they opened the first phase with a .5 GWh capacity.

The company's facility in Dunkirk is expected to come into production in 2027.

== Leadership ==
Vincent Yang is ProLogium's chief executive officer. Gilles Normand is ProLogium's head of international development.

== Awards ==
- In April 2026, ProLogium received a gold Edison Award in the Battery Materials & Manufacturing category under Material Science for its Gen 4 Superfluidized All-Inorganic Solid-State Lithium Ceramic Battery technology.
- In April 2021, ProLogium was awarded bronze at the Edison Awards for its proprietary ASM (Active Safety Mechanism) technology. The ASM is a mechanism that ensures safety and actively stops thermal runaway by passivating electrodes.
- In April 2019, ProLogium was awarded gold at the Edison Awards for its battery pack assembly technology "BiPolar+ 3D Structure Solid-State EV Battery Pack", which allows for direct connection of electrodes in series and parallel by stacking to simplify the connection materials and space for the EV battery system and improve energy density.
