= Sodium cobalt oxide =

Compounds consisting of sodium, oxygen and cobalt

Names
- Other names sodium cobaltate

Identifiers
CAS Number	37216-69-6
3D model (JSmol)	Interactive image
- InChI: InChI=1S/Co.Na.2O/q+3;+1;2*-2 Key: FMIRYHVHPPQWPV-UHFFFAOYSA-N
- SMILES: [Na+].[Co+3].[O-2].[O-2]

Properties
Chemical formula	CoNaO_{2}
Molar mass	113.921 g·mol^{−1}
Density	4.95 g·cm^{−3}
- Except where otherwise noted, data are given for materials in their standard state (at 25 °C [77 °F], 100 kPa). Infobox references

Sodium cobalt oxide, also called sodium cobaltate, is any of a range of compounds of sodium, cobalt, and oxygen with the general formula Na_{x}CoO_{2} for 0 < x ≤ 1. The name is also used for hydrated forms of those compounds, Na_{x}CoO_{2}·yH_{2}O.

The anhydrous compound was first synthesized in the 1970s. It conducts like a metal, and has exceptional thermoelectric properties (for 0.5 ≤ x ≤ 0.75) combining a large Seebeck coefficient with low resistivity, as discovered in 1997 by Ichiro Terasaki's research group. A hydrate form was found to be superconducting below 5 K. The compound, and its manganese analog, could be a cheaper alternative to the analogous lithium compounds.

== Structure ==
Like other alkali-cobalt oxides, sodium cobaltate has a layer structure. Layers of monovalent sodium cations (Na^{+}) alternate with two-dimensional anionic sheets of cobalt and oxygen atoms. Each cobalt atom is bound to six oxygen atoms forming an octahedron, with two faces parallel to the layer plane. The octahedra share edges, resulting in a layer of cobalt atoms sandwiched between two layers of oxygen atoms, all three with regular triangular roughly planar lattice . The structure is reminiscent of cuprate superconductors, except that the copper atom arrangement in the latter is a square lattice.

The cobalt atoms have formal oxidation state 4−x. Namely, the fully reduced compound NaCoO_{2} can be interpreted as Na^{+}·Co^{3+}·(O^{2−})_{2}. As the compound is oxidized, sodium cations exit the structure and the cobalt formally approaches the Co^{4+} state.

For x above 0.5, the sodium ions adopt many different arrangements in which Na ions occupy two inequivalent Wyckoff sites, 2b and 2d, of the space group P6_{3}/mmc. In galvanostatic experiments, the arrangements transition at specific values of x as the sodium content is electrolytically varied. The diffusion rate of the ions, plotted as a function of x, shows sharp dips (from about 10^{−7} to 10^{−10} cm^{2}/s at ambient temperature) at values of x that correspond to particular regular arrangements, namely 1/3, 1/2, and 5/7. Smaller and broader dips are observed around some other simple ratios, like 5/9.

For x = 0.8, at 100 K the vacancies in the sodium layer are arranged in clusters of three. The clusters are arranged in stripes, with a fixed offset between the clusters in adjacent stripes. In those conditions, the diffusion rate of the sodium atoms is minimal. At about 290 K, the structure becomes partially disordered, with the offset of between adjacent stripes becoming random. creating channels that allow their quasi-unidimensional diffusion. The sodium lattice "melts" at about 370 K, allowing two-dimensional diffusion.

As x increases, the conductivity along the main crystal planes increases, until about x = 0.85, and is roughly independent of x thereafter. The temperature dependency at those higher concentrations has metallic character. The thermopower S increases with x up to 0.97, but drops for higher x. For each composition, as a function of temperature it increases rapidly until about 130 K, and then decreases gradually. The figure of merit Z = S/ρκ (where ρ is the in-plane resistivity and κ is the thermal conductivity) is maximum for x about 0.89 at about 65 K.

== Preparation ==
The fully reduced compound NaCoO_{2} can be prepared by dissolving stoichiometric amounts of sodium acetate C_{2}H_{3}O_{2}Na and cobalt tartrate C_{4}H_{4}O_{6}Co in ethanol with a gelling agent, drying and calcinating the resulting gel, and annealing it at 650 °C.

The compound Na_{0.5}CoO_{2} (or NaCo_{2}O_{4}) can be obtained in the form of platelets up to 6 mm wide from metallic cobalt powder, by treatment with molten sodium chloride and sodium hydroxide at 550 °C.

The compound Na_{x}CoO_{2} with x around 0.8 can be obtained by treating a mixture of sodium carbonate Na_{2}CO_{3} and cobalt(II,III) oxide Co_{3}O_{4} at 850–1050 °C. Single crystals of Na_{0.8}CoO_{2} can be grown by the optical floating-zone technique.

Higher values of x can be obtained by immersing thermally grown crystals of Na_{0.71}CoO_{2} in a hot solution prepared from sodium metal and benzophenone in tetrahydrofuran for several days at 100 C.

== See also ==
- Lithium cobalt oxide
