= Cobalt(II) oxalate =

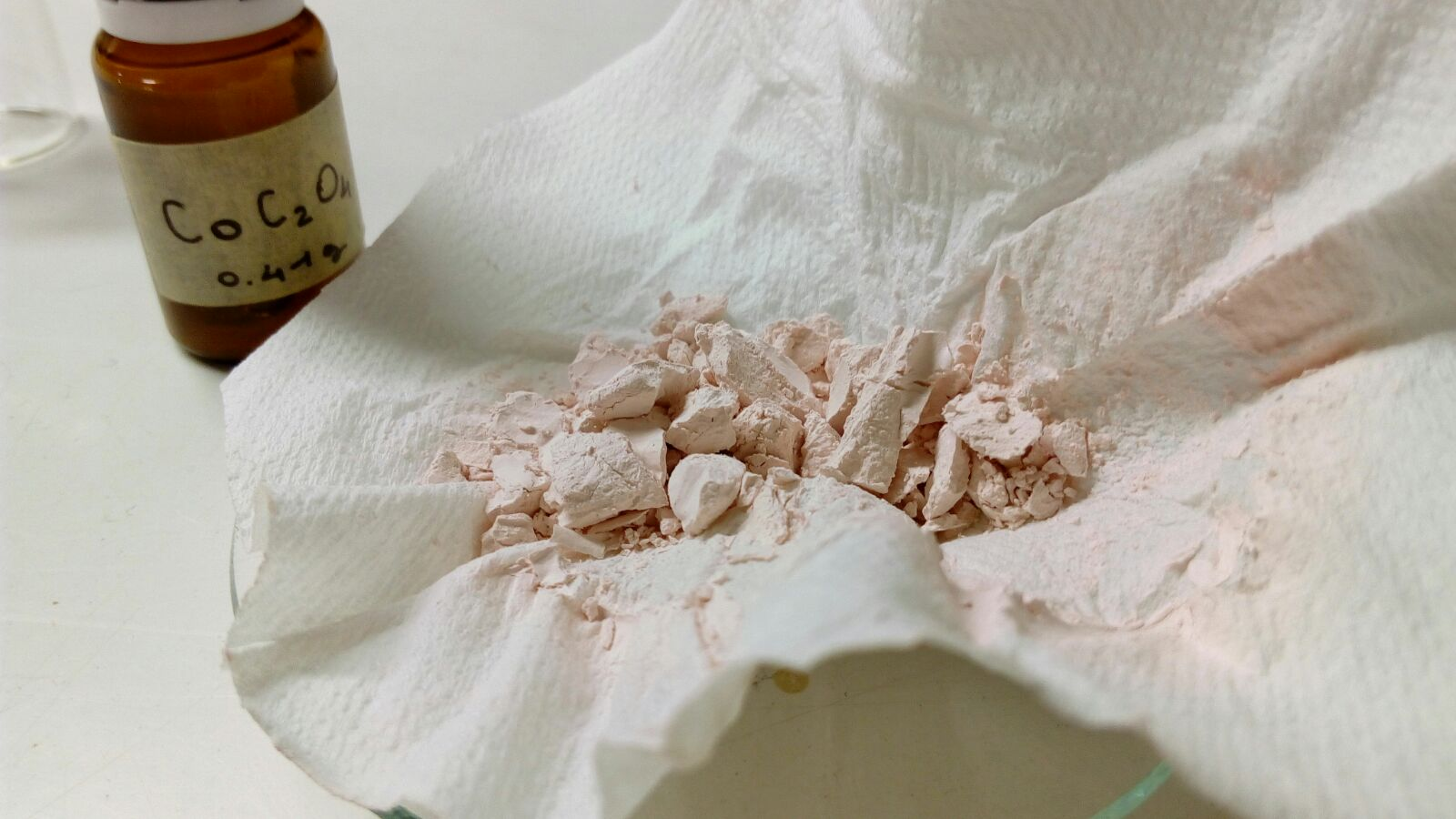

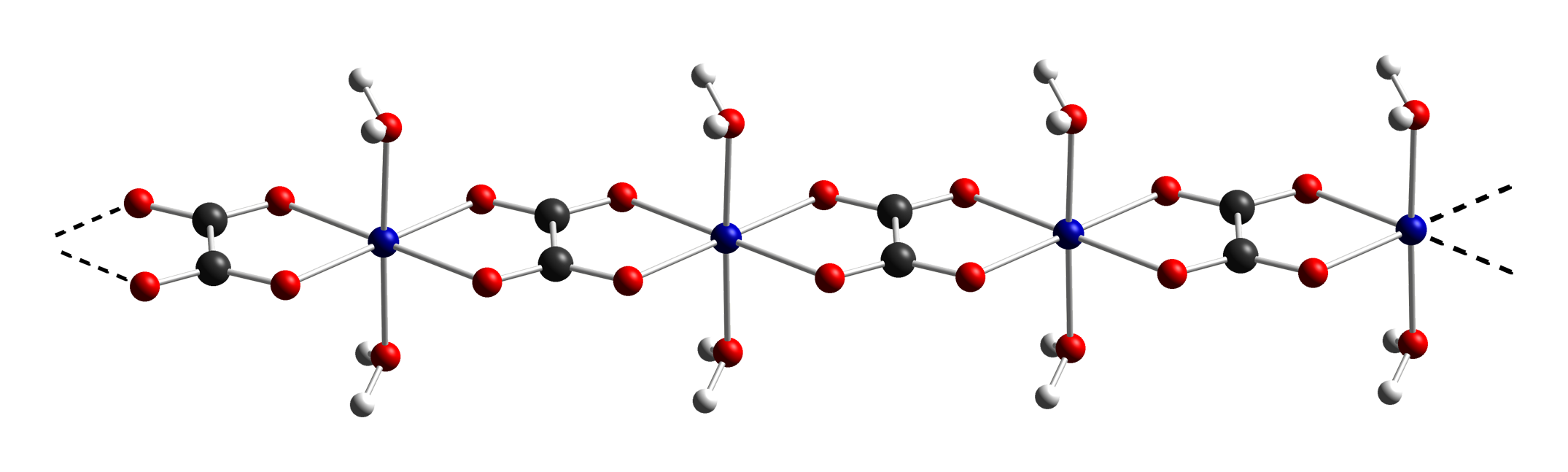

Identifiers
CAS Number	814-89-1
3D model (JSmol)	Interactive image
ChemSpider	63139
ECHA InfoCard	100.011.281
PubChem CID	69946
UNII	R028MNY8UA
CompTox Dashboard (EPA)	DTXSID10883588
- InChI: InChI=1S/C2H2O4.Co/c3-1(4)2(5)6;/h(H,3,4)(H,5,6);/q;+2/p-2 Key: MULYSYXKGICWJF-UHFFFAOYSA-L; InChI=1/C2H2O4.Co/c3-1(4)2(5)6;/h(H,3,4)(H,5,6);/q;+2/p-2 Key: MULYSYXKGICWJF-NUQVWONBAF
- SMILES: C(=O)(C(=O)[O-])[O-].[Co+2]

Properties
Chemical formula	CoC_{2}O_{4}
Molar mass	146.9522 g/mol
Appearance	gray/pink powder
Odor	odorless
Density	3.01 g/cm^{3}
Melting point	250 °C (482 °F; 523 K) (decomposes)
- Except where otherwise noted, data are given for materials in their standard state (at 25 °C [77 °F], 100 kPa). verify (what is ?) Infobox references

Cobalt(II) oxalate is the inorganic compound with the formula of CoC_{2}O_{4}. Like other simple inorganic oxalates, it is a coordination polymer. The oxalate ligands bridge of Co(OH_{2})_{2} centres. Each cobalt adopts octahedral coordination geometry.

It is used in the preparation of cobalt catalysts, and cobalt metal powder for powder-metallurgical applications. It is made in process of recycling lithium-ion batteries, where the cobalt is obtained from cathode material (LiCoO_{2}) by leaching with sulfuric acid and then precipitated with ammonium oxalate.

== Related compounds ==
Many cobalt(III) oxalate complexes are known, including [Co(C_{2}O_{4})_{3}]^{3-} and [Co(C_{2}H_{4}(NH_{2})_{2})C_{2}O_{4})_{2}]^{−}.
