= Maria Helena Braga =

Portuguese researcher

- Maria Helena Sousa Soares de Oliveira Braga
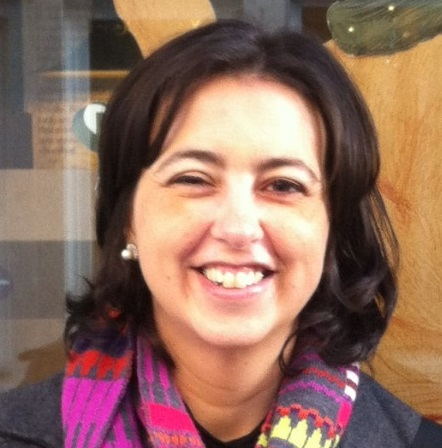
- Other names: M. H. Braga; M.H. Braga; M. Helena Braga; Helena Braga
- Education: Universidade do Porto
- Known for: Battery technology
- Scientific career
- Fields: Materials Science, Physics, Thermodynamics
- Workplaces: Materials Science and Engineering Program and Texas Materials Institute-The University of Texas at Austin, Engineering Physics Department-University of Porto, Energy and Geology National Laboratory (LNEG), S. Mamede Infesta, Portugal

Maria Helena Sousa Soares de Oliveira Braga is an associate professor at the Engineering Physics Department of University of Porto, Portugal. She is currently focused on research areas in Materials Science and Materials Engineering at University of Porto and University of Texas at Austin. She is credited with expanding the understanding of glass electrolyte and glass batteries with colleague John B. Goodenough. Braga is a senior research fellow in the Materials Institute headed by Goodenough.

== Education ==
Braga was Licentiate in physics at Porto University, Portugal in 1993 and received Doctor of Philosophy from Porto University, Portugal, in 1999.

== Research ==
Braga was Research Scholar and a Long Term Visiting Staff Member at Los Alamos National Laboratory (2008-2011). Braga is recognized for expanding our understanding of solid-glass electrolytes and glass-batteries. She has contributed research in light alloys, lead-free solders, and hydrogen storage materials. Her work with glass electrolytes was recognized by Goodenough as important, and she was persuaded to join his group to further this research.

Glass-amorphous solid electrolytes in the form of Ba-doped Li-glass and Ba-doped Na-glass are proposed by Braga as a solution to problems identified with organic liquid electrolytes used in modern lithium-ion battery cells. Sodium is easier to obtain and more environmentally friendly than lithium, and the glass electrolyte eliminates the possibility of short circuit. Batteries based on this new design may store three times as much energy as comparable Li-ion cells. In addition, designs based upon Bragas research improve the existing limitation of 500 charge cycles in Li-ion to over 1200 charge cycles and over a wider temperature range.

Helena Braga is the really force behind all of this.

— Andrew Murchison, DesignNews

Braga and colleagues at Materials for Energy Research Group in University of Porto host research projects related to glass electrolyte, magnetic refrigerators, catalyst for fuel cell reactions, and other advanced materials research.

Braga has submitted an application for a patent on a solid-carbon sodium ion based device for energy storage applications.
