= Solid-state silicon battery =

Alternative battery type

A solid-state silicon battery or silicon-anode all-solid-state battery is a type of rechargeable lithium-ion battery consisting of a solid electrolyte, solid cathode, and silicon-based solid anode.

In solid-state silicon batteries, lithium ions travel through a solid electrolyte from a positive cathode to a negative silicon anode. Silicon anodes for lithium-ion batteries have been studied and are already starting to appear in the market. Developments in 2021 showed that solid-state silicon lithium-ion batteries are possible, and offer many of the hypothesized benefits. Solid electrolytes more easily interface with the anode. These batteries are different from other solid-state batteries due to their use of silicon instead of less energy-dense materials.

Silicon is difficult to work with because it expands over 300% during lithiation (also known as lithium intercalation). This contributes to the other major difficulty: lithium loss due to a buildup within the battery.

== History ==
Lithium-ion batteries were first proposed in a 1949 French patent. Research and development began in the 1960s. These batteries initially used organic liquid electrolytes, which faced two main issues: organic electrolytes and lithium metal were unstable together, and dendrites grew during cycling, which could lead to short circuits. In the 1980s, two solutions were proposed:

1. replace lithium with some other material,
2. use a solid electrolyte.

Research into the second of these led to the first rechargeable all-solid-state lithium metal batteries.

A lab prototype silicon-anode solid-state battery was developed by collaboration between engineers from University of California, San Diego and researchers from LG Energy Solutions. Attempts to combine a solid electrolyte and a microsilicon lattice electrode achieved high energy density, low capacity degradation over hundreds of charging cycles, and lower charging temperatures.

== Silicon vs lithium ==
Silicon anodes have a theoretical specific energy of 4200 mAh/g, over 10 times the 372 mAh/g of lithium-ion batteries with graphite anodes. However, they degrade in liquid electrolytes and face issues with expansion and contraction during energy transfer. Attempts to mitigate these issues involve changing the structure of the anode by sacrificing some specific energy for more stable materials. Other attempts to mitigate the issues with liquid electrolytes involve adjusting the electrolyte for more efficient interfacing. The greatest issue with silicon is the trapping of lithium ions in the anode. Because of the difficulties, commercial applications were all but abandoned.

== Design ==
=== UCSD/LG energy solutions ===
This technology uses sulfate solid-state electrolytes (SSE) to stabilize and allow for the use of a 99.9% weight μSi anode. This limits the volumetric changes of the silicon anode during lithiation and lithium dendrite growth. The cathode is lithium nickel cobalt manganese oxide. The use of a solid-state electrolyte reduces the contact of the μSi with the electrolyte to a flat, solid surface. This makes the spreading of Li–Si more reversible. The use of a non-metallic lithium source eliminates the high temperature that metallic lithium batteries require to charge.

==== Interface ====
To allow lower charging temperatures and better interfacing, the battery uses μSi||SSE||lithium–nickel–cobalt–manganese oxide (NCM811 – LiNi_{0.8}Co_{0.1}Mn_{0.1}O_{2}). While liquid electrolyte batteries have a three-dimensional contact between the electrode and the electrolyte, silicon is conductive enough to allow a single plane of contact. The interface of the SSE and the μSi electrode remains a single plane during the volumetric change caused by lithium intercalation. A single plane prevents the multi-angled interfaces that otherwise cause structural failure.

==== Anode ====
Typical lithium-ion batteries use an anode containing carbon, between 20 and 40 percent by weight for existing silicon mixtures. This may be entirely graphite, or instead use carbon additives. In a test using NCM811 as the cathode, a carbon anode had an initial voltage plateau of 2.5 V. The silicon anode in the same test had an initial voltage plateau of 3.5 V.

Using an anode without carbon is important to prevent the SSE undergoing electrochemical decomposition. The carbon anode also caused a build up of the solid electrolyte interphase, an undesirable result of electrolyte decomposition. In the carbon-free battery, the SEI stabilized quickly. Lithium phosphorus sulfide chloride forms less-reactive products.

$\ce{Li6PS5Cl -> Li2S +Li3P + LiCl}$

The most important issue with silicon all-solid-state batteries is to reduce the loss of power in the battery over time, which limits its lifetime.
