= Donut Lab =

Finnish technology company

Donut Lab OÜ
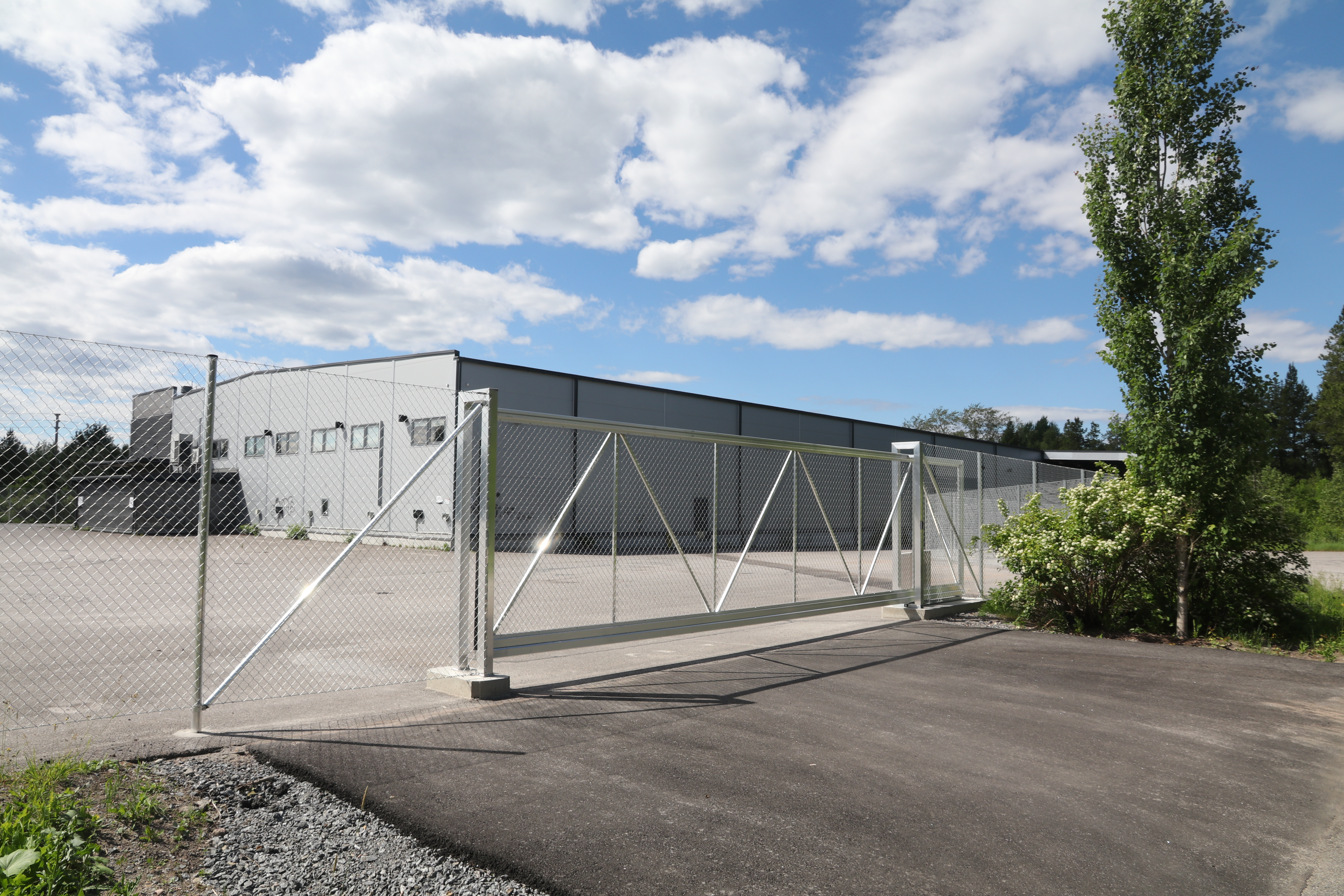
- Nordic Nano and Donut Lab factory in Imatra, Finland
- Type: Private limited company (osaühing)
- Industry: Technology
- Founded: August 2024; 2 years ago
- Founder: Marko Lehtimäki
- Owners: Donut Group Oy (50%); Donut Holding Oy (50%)
- Website: donutlab.com

Donut Lab OÜ is a Finnish technology company with headquarters in Estonia. Founded in 2024, it is owned by the Finnish companies Donut Group Oy (50%) and Donut Holding Oy (50%). Donut Lab was spun off from the Finnish company Verge Motorcycles to promote its wheel hub motors.

The company announced in January 2026 that it had created a solid-state battery, named Donut Battery, which contains no lithium and lasts for 100,000 fast-charging cycles with an energy density of 400 Wh/kg. The company announced the battery is being used in production motorcycles made by Verge, which would ship to customers in the first quarter of that year. The CEO stated in April 2026 that no batteries had been delivered to customers.

The battery claims attracted widespread criticism. Academics, researchers, and journalists disputed the validity of the claims made by Donut Lab. Battery researchers and engineers analyzing published test results stated that they were consistent with lithium-ion batteries, contradicting the company's claims.

== Founding ==
=== Verge Motorcycles ===
Donut Lab was created in August 2024 as subsidiary of Verge Motorcycles. Verge Motorcycles was founded in Seinäjoki, Finland, in 2018, as a developer and manufacturer of electric motorcycles. The company has delivered under 100 electric motorcycles since its founding until February 2026. Between January 2026 and April 2026, Verge has made one motorcycle, and no 400 Wh/kg batteries have been shipped to customers. Verge stated it aims to manufacture one motorcycle per week starting April 2026, and ramp up production to one motorcycle per day by the end of the year.

Reviews of the original Verge TS Pro motorcycle highlight the motor's torque and unique look and the model's long city-driving range, but criticize the sluggish handling and price. In response to customer feedback, the 2026 model was designed with updated suspension and shock absorbers, an adjusted steering angle, and a motor that is half the weight of its predecessor, while keeping the same power and torque.

=== Demerger into Donut Lab ===
Verge Motorcycles reported losses of about €9M and €10M in 2023 and 2024 respectively. The company's external auditor reported in 2026 it relies on loans from its Finnish parent company, its management, and their relatives, and could not complete its 2024 annual audit due to extensive deficiencies in record-keeping.

Donut Lab was founded in 2024 by Marko Lehtimäki, who previously served as Chief Technology Officer of Verge Motorcycles. Prior to becoming separate entities in August 2024, Verge Motorcycles and Donut Lab raised 15 million euro in 2024. Donut Lab raised 25 million euro in a seed funding round in July 2025.

Donut Lab announced the full acquisition of Nordic Nano in August 2026, a startup company of which Donut Lab previously had a controlling stake.

== Wheel hub motor ==
Donut Lab promotes the Donut Motor, a wheel hub motor developed by Verge Motorcycles that takes its name from its toroid donut-like shape. The motor integrates directly into the vehicle's tire assembly, eliminating the need for a traditional transmission, and freeing the space where the motor would traditionally be, so a battery module can take its place.

At the January 2026 Consumer Electronics Show (CES), the company unveiled several motor designs, among them a 21-inch 40 kg (88 lb) motor designed for delivering 630 kW (840 hp) of power and 4,300 N⋅m (3,200 lbf⋅ft) of torque, and a 17-inch 21 kg (46 lb) motor designed for 150 kW (200 hp) and 1,200 N⋅m (890 lbf⋅ft).

== Solid-state battery ==
Donut Lab introduced its solid-state battery, Donut Battery, at CES 2026. The company's CEO, Marko Lehtimäki, stated that it contains no lithium. The CEO stated the battery pack is integrated into Verge motorcycles that will be delivered to customers in the first quarter of 2026. According to the CEO, the battery cell has an energy density of 400 Wh/kg (180 Wh/lb); the motorcycle battery pack is capable of 100,000 charge cycles at a C-rate of 5C; it operates in temperatures from −30 to 100 °C or −30 to 200 °F; it can be discharged to 0% and charged to 100% in daily use with no damage; and it's priced lower than current automotive lithium-ion batteries. No independent testing was done in support of the claims presented, however, with the company presenting mockups in place of actual batteries.

Eight months later, the CEO said the battery can last for 5,000 fast charging cycles, and will only last 100,000 cycles under gentler conditions in moderate temperatures.

=== Production ===
Motorcycles equipped with the battery were scheduled to ship to customers in the first quarter of 2026. When questioned by journalists, the company did not disclose the location of its battery production facility. Internal correspondence published by Helsingin Sanomat describes the business relationship between Donut Lab, Nordic Nano, and CT-Coating up to March 2026: Donut Lab is the productizer of the battery, Nordic Nano is the manufacturer, and CT-Coating is the developer and supplier of the manufacturing equipment. Donut Lab asked CT-Coating in March 2026 for measurement results that would match the specifications that were announced by Donut Lab in January at CES 2026, which was later tested by VTT. CT-Coating did not provide these results. CT-Coating stopped the development of that battery, and started exclusively developing a different battery. At the end of March, Donut Lab asked when it would be able to conduct tests on the new battery. Helsingin Sanomat concluded from the correspondence that Donut Lab never had a production-ready battery.

=== Criminal complaint ===
Helsingin Sanomat reported in April 2026 that the CCO of Nordic Nano, the company manufacturing the Donut Lab battery and itself partly owned by Donut Lab, had filed a criminal complaint against Donut Lab, alleging that the battery's energy density, charging cycle endurance, and mass-production readiness advertised by Donut Lab had not been achieved.

=== Criticism ===
Donut Lab's battery claims immediately attracted widespread criticism from battery experts in academia,^{[a]} battery industry executives, finance industry professionals, technology journalists, and discussion participants on technology websites. Ulderico Ulissi, head of off-China operations of the battery manufacturer CATL, called the claims fake. Yang Hongxin, CEO of the battery manufacturer SVOLT, said a battery with those technical details does not exist and called it a scam.

=== Evidence ===
==== VTT ====
Lehtimäki said in a February 2026 video that VTT Technical Research Centre of Finland (VTT) had been hired to perform tests of the battery as specified by Donut Lab. Battery researchers and engineers^{[b]} analyzing the published VTT results found them consistent with those of currently available battery cells with a Si-Gr anode and Li-NMC cathode, and that the voltage to state-of-charge curve strongly indicates the device chemistry is Li-NMC. Over 20 academics and battery engineers were asked to assess the results. All of them found the results indicate a lithium-ion battery, contradicting statements by Donut Lab that the battery contains no lithium. Experts criticize Donut Lab for not performing capacity fade and pack-level performance tests, and the capacity degradation at the 11C test indicates the battery reaches 70% of its original capacity after 30-50 such cycles.

==== Intertek ====
Donut Lab provided a sample device to Intertek in August 2026 for a nail-penetration test. The report notes Intertek did not verify the device is a functioning battery cell. Donut Lab provided other samples in "tear down condition" for lithium and sodium analysis. Intertek reported the samples match the ones from the nail-penetration test, and contained 632 parts-per-million sodium and 3.4 ppm lithium. Donut Lab argues this rules out the device is a lithium or sodium battery. No analysis was performed on the electrolyte, no investigation of the battery was performed, and there was no confirmation the device given to Intertek was the same as the battery tested by VTT.

== Notes ==
a. Shirley Meng, University of Chicago; Eric Wachsman, University of Maryland; Tanja Kallio, Aalto University; Daniel Brandell, Uppsala University; Simon Lux, University of Münster
b. Euan McTurk PhD, Markus Gehring PhD, Julian Zahnow MSc, Joachim Sann PhD, Tom Bötticher MSc, Juho Heiska DSc, and over 16 others
