= QuantumScape =

American battery company

Quantum Scape
- Company type: Public
- Traded as: Nasdaq: QS (Class A); Russell 1000 component
- ISIN: US74767V1098
- Industry: Electric batteries
- Founded: May 14, 2010; 16 years ago at Stanford University
- Founders: Jagdeep Singh; Tim Holme; Fritz Prinz
- Headquarters: San Jose, California, U.S.
- Key people: Dennis Segers (Chairman), Dr. Siva Sivaram (CEO)
- Number of employees: 850 (2023)
- Website: www.quantumscape.com

QuantumScape Corporation is an American company that researches and develops solid-state rechargeable lithium metal batteries for use in electric cars. It was founded in 2010 and is headquartered in San Jose, California, employs around 850 people. Major investors include Volkswagen Group and Bill Gates.

== History ==
QuantumScape was founded in 2010 by Jagdeep Singh, Tim Holme and Professor Fritz Prinz of Stanford University. In 2012, QuantumScape began working with German automaker Volkswagen.

In 2018, Volkswagen invested $100 million in the company, becoming the largest shareholder. In the same year, Volkswagen and QuantumScape announced the establishment of a joint production project to prepare for mass production of solid-state batteries. In June 2020, Volkswagen invested an additional $200 million.

In 2020, QuantumScape merged with the special-purpose acquisition company Kensington Capital Acquisition. As a result of the merger, QuantumScape received $1 billion in financing, from investors including Volkswagen and the Qatar Investment Authority. At the same time, the company's shares listed on the NASDAQ under the symbol QS. In the last quarter of 2020, QuantumScape briefly surpassed the valuation of Ford Motor Co. without a commercial product and without revenue.

On April 15, 2021, hedge fund Scorpion Capital announced their short position in the stock, labeling the company a pump-and-dump scheme.

On June 26, 2022, the company announced the production of a solid-state battery with a range of 650 km and a charge time of 15 minutes.

At the beginning of 2024, Volkswagen and QuantumScape presented a battery prototype in a press release based on the technologies developed by QuantumScape, which has 1000 charging cycles with only 5% capacity loss and an energy density that is at least a third higher. In July 2024, VW PowerCo and QS announced an agreement for volume production. The initial goal is 40 gigawatt-hours’ worth of batteries per year.

In October 2024, QuantumScape introduced a prototype of their first planned commercial product they are calling QSE-5. The QSE-5 B-sample cell has a measured cell energy of 21.6 Watt-hours (Wh) at C/5 discharge rate and 25 °C. This is divided by the cell volume to get the volumetric energy density of 844 Wh/L or by the cell mass to get the gravimetric energy density (also called specific energy) of 301 Wh/kg.

In October 2025, QuantumScape began shipping QSE-5 B1 samples. QuantumScape also demonstrated the QSE-5 cells powering a Ducati V21L motorcycle.

== Technology ==
The battery uses a lithium metal anode. The solid-state ceramic separator prevents dendrites and does not react with lithium. An organic liquid electrolyte then envelops the cathode.
