= Lithium cobalt oxide =

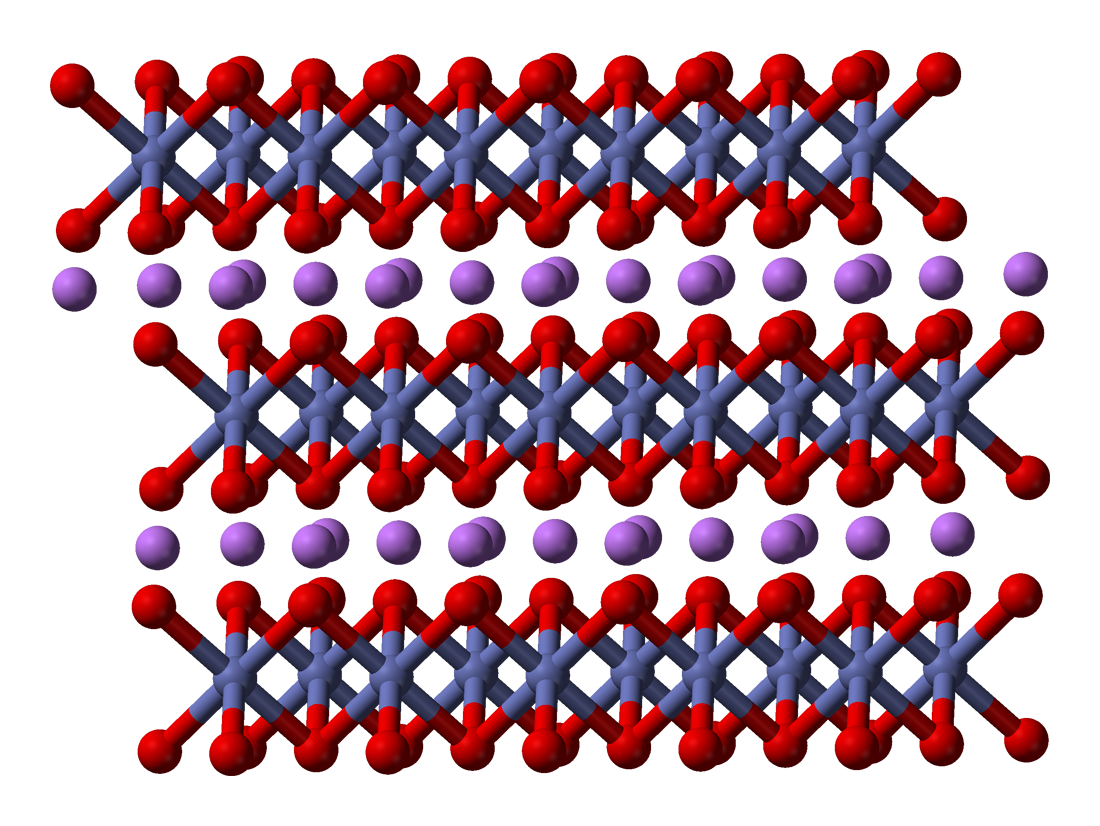
- __ Li^{+} __ Co^{3+} __ O^{2−}

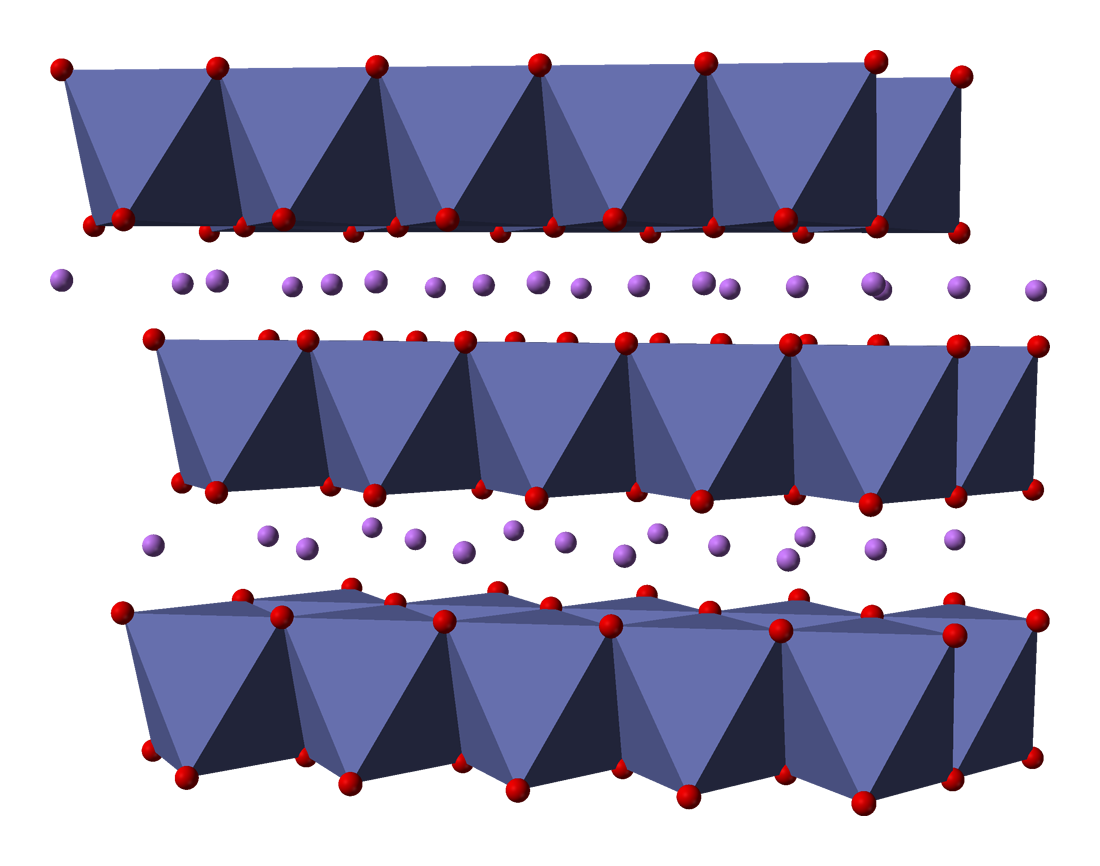

Names
- IUPAC name lithium cobalt(III) oxide
- Other names lithium cobaltite

Identifiers
CAS Number	12190-79-3
3D model (JSmol)	Interactive image
ChemSpider	11262976
ECHA InfoCard	100.032.135
EC Number	235-362-0
PubChem CID	23670860
UN number	UN 3077
CompTox Dashboard (EPA)	DTXSID40893216
- InChI: InChI=1S/Co.Li.2O/q+3;+1;2*-2 Key: LSZLYXRYFZOJRA-UHFFFAOYSA-N
- SMILES: [Li+].[O-2].[Co+3].[O-2]

Properties
Chemical formula	LiCoO_{2}
Molar mass	97.87 g·mol^{−1}
Appearance	Black powder
Density	4.82 g/cm^{3}
Melting point	600 °C (1,112 °F; 873 K)
Solubility in water	0.3 mg/L (20 °C (68 °F), pH: 7.46)
Band gap	0.66 eV

Structure
Crystal structure	Ditrigonal scalenohedral (166)
Space group	R3̅m
Point group	3̅m
Lattice constant	a = 2.814 Å, b = 2.814 Å, c = 13.91 Å α = 90°, β = 90°, γ = 120°
Lattice volume (V)	95.20 Å^{3}
Formula units (Z)	3

Hazards
- Occupational safety and health (OHS/OSH)
Main hazards	harmful
- GHS labelling
Pictograms	(GHS08: Health hazard) (GHS09: Environmental hazard)
Signal word	Danger
Hazard statements	H351, H360, H410
Precautionary statements	P201, P202, P273, P280, P308+P313, P391, P405, P501
NFPA 704 (fire diamond)	0 0 1
Threshold limit value (TLV)	0.02 mg/m^{3} (as Cobalt) (TWA)
- Lethal dose or concentration (LD, LC)
LD_{50} (median dose)	>5000 mg/kg (oral, rat, female)
LC_{50} (median concentration)	5.05 mg/L (inhalation, rat, 4h, dust/mist)
- Except where otherwise noted, data are given for materials in their standard state (at 25 °C [77 °F], 100 kPa). verify (what is ?) Infobox references

Lithium cobalt oxide, sometimes called lithium cobaltate or lithium cobaltite, is a chemical compound with formula LiCoO_{2}. The cobalt atoms are formally in the +3 oxidation state, hence the IUPAC name lithium cobalt(III) oxide.

Lithium cobalt oxide is a black powder, and is commonly used in the positive electrodes of lithium-ion batteries especially in handheld electronics.

== Structure ==
The structure of LiCoO_{2} has been studied with numerous techniques including x-ray diffraction, electron microscopy, neutron powder diffraction, and EXAFS.

The solid consists of layers of monovalent lithium cations (Li^{+}) that lie between extended anionic sheets of cobalt and oxygen atoms, arranged as edge-sharing octahedra, with two faces parallel to the sheet plane. The cobalt atoms are formally in the trivalent oxidation state (Co^{3+}) and are sandwiched between two layers of oxygen atoms (O^{2−}).

In each layer (cobalt, oxygen, or lithium), the atoms are arranged in a regular triangular lattice. The lattices are offset so that the lithium atoms are farthest from the cobalt atoms, and the structure repeats in the direction perpendicular to the planes every three cobalt (or lithium) layers. The point group symmetry is 3̅m in Hermann-Mauguin notation, signifying a unit cell with threefold improper rotational symmetry and a mirror plane. The threefold rotational axis (which is normal to the layers) is termed improper because the triangles of oxygen (being on opposite sides of each octahedron) are anti-aligned.

== Preparation ==
Fully reduced lithium cobalt oxide can be prepared by heating a stoichiometric mixture of lithium carbonate (Li_{2}CO_{3}) and cobalt(II,III) oxide (Co_{3}O_{4}) or metallic cobalt at 600–800 °C (1,112–1,472 °F), then annealing the product at 900 °C (1,650 °F) for many hours, all under an oxygen atmosphere.

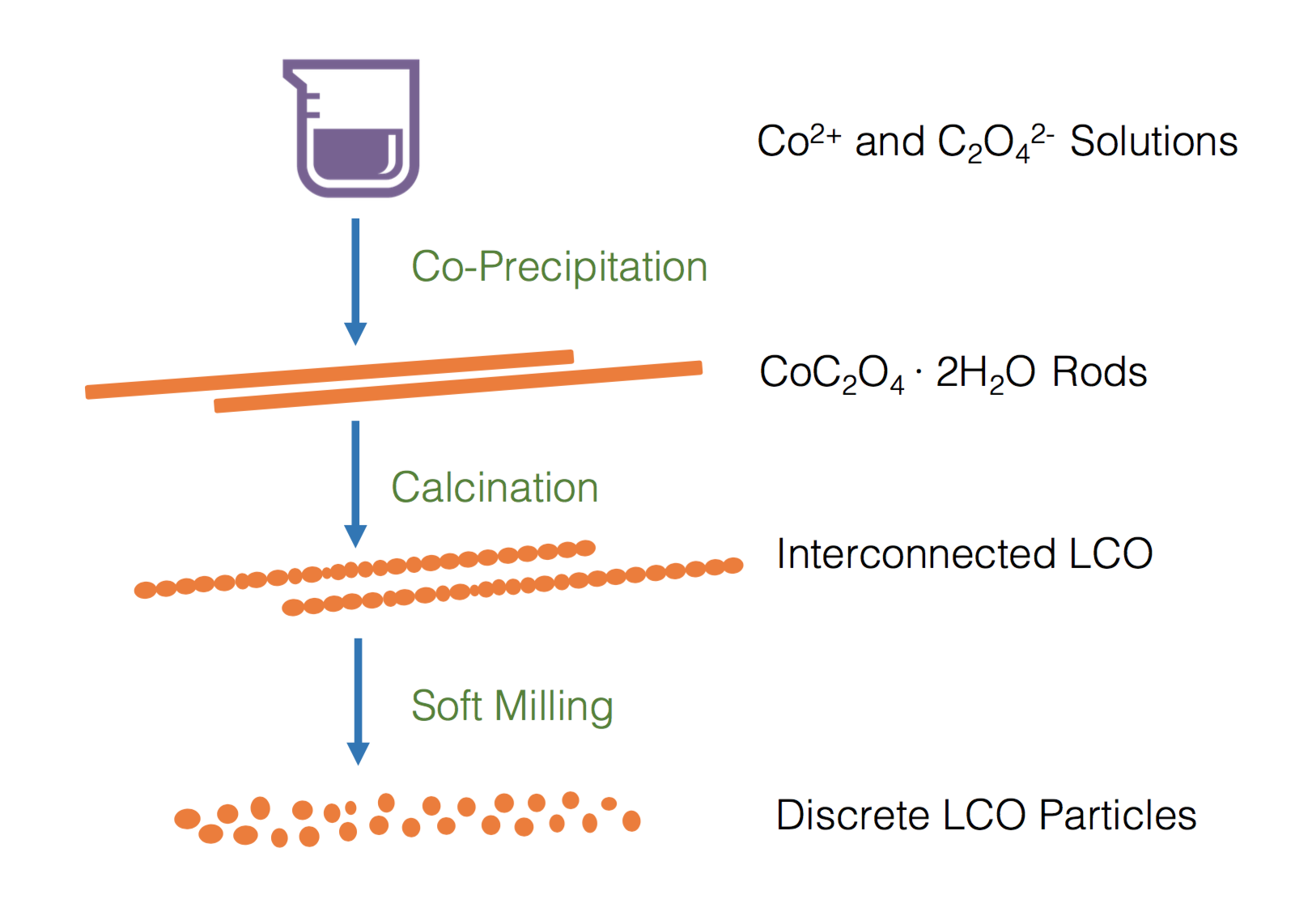
Nanometer-sized and sub-micrometer sized LCO synthesis route.

Nanometer-size particles more suitable for cathode use can also be obtained by calcination of hydrated cobalt oxalate (β-CoC_{2}O_{4}·2H_{2}O), in the form of rod-like crystals about 8 μm long and 0.4 μm wide, with lithium hydroxide (LiOH), up to 750–900 °C (1,380–1,650 °F).

A third method uses lithium acetate, cobalt acetate, and citric acid in equal molar amounts, in water solution. Heating at 80 °C (176 °F) turns the mixture into a viscous transparent gel. The dried gel is then ground and heated gradually to 550 °C (1,022 °F).

== Use in rechargeable batteries ==
The usefulness of lithium cobalt oxide as an intercalation electrode was discovered in 1980 by an Oxford University research group led by John B. Goodenough and Tokyo University's Koichi Mizushima.

The compound is now used as the cathode in some rechargeable lithium-ion batteries, with particle sizes ranging from nanometers to micrometers. During charging, the cobalt is partially oxidized to the +4 state, with some lithium ions moving to the electrolyte, resulting in a range of compounds LixCoO_{2} with 0 < x < 1.

Surface modification with single wall carbon nanotubes (SWCNTs) has been investigated to improve the high-rate performance and cycling stability of LiCoO2 cathodes. An optimized SWCNT coating forms conductive pathways between LCO particles; one study reported 138.3 mAh/g at 10C, compared with 69.8 mAh/g for uncoated LCO, and 80.9% capacity retention after 500 cycles at 10C.

Batteries produced with LiCoO_{2} cathodes have very stable capacities, but have lower capacities and power than those with cathodes based on (especially nickel-rich) nickel-cobalt-aluminum (NCA) or nickel-cobalt-manganese (NCM) oxides. Issues with thermostability are better for LiCoO_{2} cathodes than other nickel-rich chemistries although not significantly. This makes LiCoO_{2} batteries susceptible to thermal runaway in cases of abuse such as high temperature operation (>130 °C (266 °F)) or overcharging. At elevated temperatures, LiCoO_{2} decomposition generates oxygen, which then reacts with the organic electrolyte of the cell, this reaction is often seen in Lithium-Ion batteries where the battery becomes highly volatile and must be recycled in a safe manner. The decomposition of LiCoO_{2} is a safety concern due to the magnitude of this highly exothermic reaction, which can spread to adjacent cells or ignite nearby combustible material. In general, this is seen for many lithium-ion battery cathodes.

== Safety ==
Although not especially acutely toxic, with an LD_{50} of over 5000 mg/kg in mice, LiCoO_{2} is a suspected human carcinogen and teratogen, and may damage fertility. It has a high acute and chronic toxicity to aquatic life.

== See also ==
- List of battery types
- Sodium cobalt oxide
