= Nanoionics =

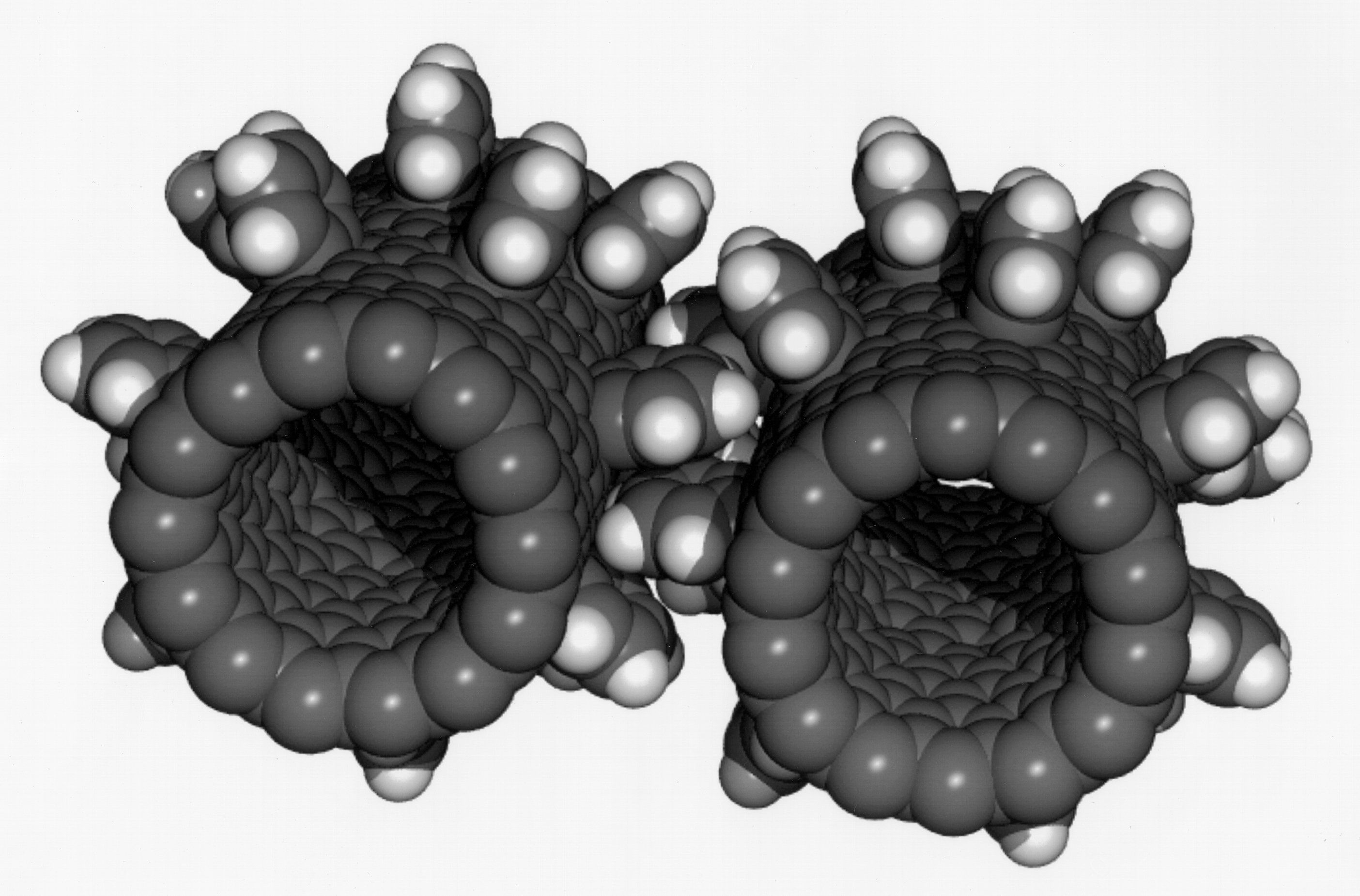
This photograph depicts two "Fullerene Nano-gears" with multiple teeth. The hope is that one day, products can be constructed made of thousands of tiny machines that could self-repair and adapt to the environment in which they exist.

Nanoionics is the study and application of phenomena, properties, effects, methods and mechanisms of processes connected with fast ion transport (FIT) in all-solid-state nanoscale systems. The topics of interest include fundamental properties of oxide ceramics at nanometer length scales, and fast ion conductor (advanced superionic conductor)/electronic conductor heterostructures. Potential applications are in electrochemical devices (electrical double layer devices) for conversion and storage of energy, charge and information. The term and conception of nanoionics (as a new branch of science) were first introduced by A.L. Despotuli and V.I. Nikolaichik (Institute of Microelectronics Technology and High Purity Materials, Russian Academy of Sciences, Chernogolovka) in January 1992.

A multidisciplinary scientific and industrial field of solid state ionics, dealing with ionic transport phenomena in solids, considers Nanoionics as its new division. Nanoionics tries to describe, for example, diffusion&reactions, in terms that make sense only at a nanoscale, e.g., in terms of non-uniform (at a nanoscale) potential landscape.

There are two classes of solid-state ionic nanosystems and two fundamentally different nanoionics: (I) nanosystems based on solids with low ionic conductivity, and (II) nanosystems based on advanced superionic conductors (e.g. alpha–AgI, rubidium silver iodide–family). Nanoionics-I and nanoionics-II differ from each other in the design of interfaces. The role of boundaries in nanoionics-I is the creation of conditions for high concentrations of charged defects (vacancies and interstitials) in a disordered space-charge layer. But in nanoionics-II, it is necessary to conserve the original highly ionic conductive crystal structures of advanced superionic conductors at ordered (lattice-matched) heteroboundaries. Nanoionic-I can significantly enhance (up to ~10^{8} times) the 2D-like ion conductivity in nanostructured materials with structural coherence, but it is remaining ~10^{3} times smaller relatively to 3D ionic conductivity of advanced superionic conductors.

The classical theory of diffusion and migration in solids is based on the notion of a diffusion coefficient, activation energy and electrochemical potential. This means that accepted is the picture of a hopping ion transport in the potential landscape where all barriers are of the same height (uniform potential relief). Despite the obvious difference of objects of solid state ionics and nanoionics-I, -II, the true new problem of fast ion transport and charge/energy storage (or transformation) for these objects (fast ion conductors) has a special common basis: non-uniform potential landscape on nanoscale (for example) which determines the character of the mobile ion subsystem response to an impulse or harmonic external influence, e.g. a weak influence in Dielectric spectroscopy (impedance spectroscopy).

== Characteristics ==
Being a branch of nanoscience and nanotechnology, nanoionics is unambiguously defined by its own objects (nanostructures with FIT), subject matter (properties, phenomena, effects, mechanisms of processes, and applications connected with FIT at nano-scale), method (interface design in nanosystems of superionic conductors), and the criterion (R/L ~1, where R is the length scale of device structures, and L is the characteristic length on which the properties, characteristics, and other parameters connected with FIT change drastically).

The International Technology Roadmap for Semiconductors (ITRS) relates nanoionics-based resistive switching memories to the category of "emerging research devices" ("ionic memory"). The area of close intersection of nanoelectronics and nanoionics had been called nanoelionics (1996). Now, the vision of future nanoelectronics constrained solely by fundamental ultimate limits is being formed in advanced research. The ultimate physical limits to computation are very far beyond the currently attained (10^{10} cm^{−2}, 10^{10} Hz) region. What kind of logic switches might be used at the near nm- and sub-nm peta-scale integration? The question was the subject matter already in, where the term "nanoelectronics" was not used yet. Quantum mechanics constrains electronic distinguishable configurations by the tunneling effect at tera-scale. To overcome 10^{12} cm^{−2} bit density limit, atomic and ion configurations with a characteristic dimension of L <2 nm should be used in the information domain and materials with an effective mass of information carriers m* considerably larger than electronic ones are required: m* =13 m_{e} at L =1 nm, m* =53 m_{e} (L =0,5 nm) and m* =336 m_{e} (L =0,2 nm). Future short-sized devices may be nanoionic, i.e. based on the fast ion transport at the nanoscale, as it was first stated in.

== Examples ==
The examples of nanoionic devices are all-solid-state supercapacitors with fast ion transport at the functional heterojunctions (nanoionic supercapacitors), lithium batteries and fuel cells with nanostructured electrodes, nano-switches with quantized conductivity on the basis of fast ion conductors (see also memristors and programmable metallization cell). These are well compatible with sub-voltage and deep-sub-voltage nanoelectronics and could find wide applications, for example in autonomous micro power sources, RFID, MEMS, smartdust, nanomorphic cell, other micro- and nanosystems, or reconfigurable memory cell arrays.

An important case of fast ionic conduction in solid states is in the surface space-charge layer of ionic crystals. Such conduction was first predicted by Kurt Lehovec. A significant role of boundary conditions with respect to ionic conductivity was first experimentally discovered by C.C. Liang who found an anomalously high conduction in the LiI-Al_{2}O_{3} two-phase system. Because a space-charge layer with specific properties has nanometer thickness, the effect is directly related to nanoionics (nanoionics-I). The Lehovec effect has become the basis for the creation of a multitude of nanostructured fast ion conductors which are used in modern portable lithium batteries and fuel cells. In 2012, a 1D structure-dynamic approach was developed in nanoionics for a detailed description of the space charge formation and relaxation processes in irregular potential relief (direct problem) and interpretation of characteristics of nanosystems with fast ion transport (inverse problem), as an example, for the description of a collective phenomenon: coupled ion transport and dielectric-polarization processes which lead to A. K. Jonscher's "universal" dynamic response.

== See also ==
- Programmable metallization cell
