= Leslie Schoop =

Materials chemist and academic

- Born: Leslie Mareike Schoop
- Education: Princeton University; University of Mainz
- Awards: National Science Foundation CAREER Award (2022); Beckman Young Investigators Award (2019)
- Scientific career
- Fields: Materials Science; Solid-state chemistry Solid-state physics
- Workplaces: Princeton University; Max Planck Institute for Solid State Research
- Thesis: The search for superconductors through solid state chemistry (2015)
- Doctoral advisor: Robert Cava
- Other academic advisors: Bettina Lotsch
- Website: schoop.princeton.edu

Leslie Mareike Schoop is a German-American materials chemist who is an associate professor at Princeton University. Her research considers the realization of new materials for quantum technologies. She has identified several new topological materials, including ZrSiS, a non-toxic, air-stable topological semi-metal.

== Early life and education ==
Schoop grew up in Germany close to the border with Belgium. She has said that her mother was a strong independent woman. She was an undergraduate student at the Johannes-Gutenberg Universitaet in Mainz. She completed her doctoral research at Princeton University, where she worked on exotic properties in condensed matter with Robert Cava. She was unsure whether to pursue a career in academia or industry, and turned to her grandfather for her advice, who said, "You know, Leslie, money should never be a reason why you make a career decision. If you're good at your job, the money will come".

== Research and career ==
After her PhD, Schoop remained at Princeton for a postdoctoral position, during which she worked on superconductivity. She was awarded a Minerva program fellowship and moved to the Max Planck Institute for Solid State Research to work alongside Bettina Lotsch, where she found the first non-toxic air-stable topological semi-metal, ZrSiS.

In 2017, Schoop established her own research group at Princeton, where she identified new topological semimetals and predicted their crystal properties. She was supported by the Beckman Foundation to investigate new magnetic topological materials low-power computation.

In 2022, she identified a new quantum state in twisted bilayer tungsten ditelluride. In confined electrons, twisted bilayer graphene are strongly correlated, forming one-dimensional linear arrays of conductive channels. The observation of Luttinger liquids in two-dimensional materials was expected to be very challenging to achieve experimentally, but Schoop and co-workers observed it in a Moiré super lattice.

=== Awards and honors ===
- 2015 Minerva Fast Track Fellowship, Max Planck Society
- 2019 EPiQS Materials Synthesis Investigator – Gordon and Betty Moore Foundation
- 2019 Beckman Young Investigator Award
- 2020 Packard Fellowship in Science and Engineering
- 2021 Office for Naval Research (ONR) Young Investigator Award
- 2021 Sloan Fellowship
- 2022 National Science Foundation CAREER Award

=== Selected publications ===
- Large, non-saturating magnetoresistance in WTe2
- Dirac cone protected by non-symmorphic symmetry and three-dimensional Dirac line node in ZrSiS
- A new form of Ca3P2 with a ring of Dirac nodes
