= Le Gouès =

Le Gouès, Le Goues, or LeGoues is a French surname. Notable people with the surname include:

- Claire Le Goues, American software engineer
- Francoise LeGoues, American materials scientist and technology executive
- Sébastien Le Gouès, Sieur de Sourdeval, French governor of Saint Pierre at the time of the Newfoundland expedition (1702)
