= Ionic conductivity =

Ionic conductivity may refer to:

- Conductivity (electrolytic), electrical conductivity due to an electrolyte separating into ions in solution
- Ionic conductivity (solid state), electrical conductivity due to ions moving position in a crystal lattice
- Fast ion conductor
