= Carl Wagner =

German chemist (1901–1977)

- Born: 25 May 1901; Leipzig, German Empire
- Died: 10 December 1977 (aged 76); Göttingen, Germany
- Education: Ludwig-Maximilians-Universität München; Leipzig University
- Known for: Solid state chemistry Solid state ionics
- Awards: Olin Palladium Award (1951); Wilhelm Exner Medal (1959)
- Scientific career
- Fields: Physical chemistry
- Workplaces: University of Jena; University of Hamburg; Technical University of Darmstadt; Max Planck Institute
- Thesis: Beiträge zur Kenntnis der Reaktionsgeschwindigkeit in Lösungen
- Doctoral advisor: Max Le Blanc

Carl Wilhelm Wagner (25 May 1901 in Leipzig, Germany – 10 December 1977 in Göttingen, Germany) was a German physical chemist. He is best known for his pioneering work on solid-state chemistry, where his work on oxidation rate theory, counter diffusion of ions and defect chemistry led to a better understanding of how reactions take place at the atomic level. His life and achievements were honoured in a Solid State Ionics symposium commemorating his 100th birthday in 2001, where he was described as the father of solid-state chemistry.

== Early life ==
Wagner was born in Leipzig, Germany; the son of Dr Julius Wagner who was the Head of Chemistry at the local institute and secretary of the German Bunsen Society of Physical Chemistry. Wagner graduated from the Ludwig-Maximilians-Universität München and gained his PhD at Leipzig University in 1924 supervised by Max Le Blanc with a dissertation on the reaction rate in solutions, "Beiträge zur Kenntnis der Reaktionsgeschwindigkeit in Lösungen".

== Career ==
Wagner was interested in the measurement of thermodynamic activities of the components in solid and liquid alloys. He also researched problems of solid-state chemistry, especially the role of defects of ionic crystals on thermodynamic properties, electrical conductivity and diffusion.

He became a research fellow at the Bodernstein Institute at the Friedrich Wilhelm University of Berlin. It was in Berlin that he first became acquainted with Walter H. Schottky who asked him to co-author a book on thermodynamic problems. Together with Hermann Ulich they published Thermodynamik in 1929, which is still considered a standard reference in the field.

In 1930, he was Privatdozent at the University of Jena and published a notable paper with Schottky, "Theorie der geordneten Mischphasen" (Theory of arranged mixed phases).

In 1931, he published a paper "Zur Theorie der Gleichrichterwirkung" ("Theory of Rectifier Action") [C. Wagner, Zur Theorie der Gleichrichterwirkung, Phys. Zeitschrift, Vol. 32 (1931), pp 641-645] describing in the context of copper oxide semiconductors the basic equations of thermally activated charge carriers and their diffusion in rectifier junctions which were later described by others such as Davydov [B. Davydov, The rectifying action of semi-conductors, The Technical Physics of the USSR, Vol. 5, No. 2 (1938), pp. 87-95] and Shockley [Shockley, William (1949). "The Theory of p-n Junctions in Semiconductors and p-n Junction Transistors". Bell System Technical Journal. 28 (3): 435–489. doi:10.1002/j.1538-7305.1949.tb03645].

His subsequent published papers led to the new concept of chemical disorder now known as defect chemistry. Wagner spent one year as Visiting Professor of Physical Chemistry, at the University of Hamburg in 1933, before moving to the Technische Universität Darmstadt where he was Professor of Physical Chemistry until 1945. He proposed an important law of oxidation kinetics in 1933.

In 1936, he published a crucial paper "On the mechanism of the formation of ionic crystals of higher order (double salts, spinels, silicates)", a concept of counter-diffusion of cations, which contributed to the understanding of all diffusion controlled, solid-state reactions. Over a twenty-year period he produced an important body of work relating to the bulk transport processes in oxides.

Wagner and Schottky proposed the point defect-mediated mechanism of mass transport in solids, Wagner then extended the analysis to electronic defects. For these works and his subsequent research on local equilibrium, his oxidation rate theory, and the concept of counter diffusion of cations, Wagner is considered by some as the "father of solid state chemistry."

At the end of the Second World War, it was anticipated that German universities and research establishments would undergo a long period of rebuilding. Wagner was invited to the United States to become a scientific advisor at Fort Bliss, Texas, with other German scientists as part of Operation Paperclip. He acquired US citizenship at this time. His work on the thermodynamics of fuels used in V2-rockets was continued by Malcolm Hebb and their techniques are now known as the Hebb-Wagner polarisation method. Wagner was a professor of metallurgy at MIT from 1949 until 1958. He then returned to Germany to take up the position of Director of the Max Planck Institute of Physical Chemistry at Göttingen, which was vacant due to the untimely death of Karl Friedrich Bonhoeffer. In 1961, he produced a paper on the theory of the ageing of precipitates by dissolution-reprecipitation Ostwald ripening, now known as the Lifshitz-Slyozov-Wagner theory, which helps predict the rate of coarsening in alloys. When NASA tested the theory in space shuttle experiments they discovered the theory did not work as they initially expected and realised the way engineers had been using it needed to be reconsidered.

== Legacy ==
Wagner officially retired in 1966, but was from 1967 to 1977 a Scientific Member of the Max Planck Institute in Göttingen, continuing to contribute to publications. Many modern inventions based on solid-state technology and semiconductor fabrication, used in devices such as solar energy conversion have been developed with the aid of Wagner's theories. Some examples of solid state electrochemical devices are typically, fuel cells, batteries, sensors and membranes.

Wagner died on 10 December 1977 in Göttingen.

== Honours ==
- 1951 - Palladium Medal of the Electrochemical Society
- 1957 - Willis R. Whitney Award, NACE
- 1959 - Wilhelm Exner Medal of the Austrian Industry Association
- 1961 - Bunsen Medal of the German Bunsen Society
- 1964 - Carl Friedrich Gauss Medal of the Brunswick Scientific Society
- 1972 - Honorary member of the German Bunsen Society
- 1972 - Heyn Medal of the German Society of Metallurgy
- 1973 - Cavallaro Medal, European Federation of Corrosion
- Honorary member of American Institute of Mining, Metallurgical and Petroleum Engineers
- 1973 - Honorary member of the Mathematics and Natural Sciences of the Austrian Academy of Sciences in Vienna
- 1973 - Gold Medal of the American Society for Metals
- 1975 - Honorary Membership of the Japan Institute of Metals
- 1975 - Corresponding member of the Brunswick Scientific Society

== See also ==
- Electrochemical engineering
- Diffusion
- Solid-state ionics
- Lifshitz–Slyozov–Wagner theory
