= Wyder =

Wyder is a surname. Notable people with the surname include:

- Daniel Wyder (born 1962), Swiss racing cyclist
- Judith Wyder (born 1988), Swiss orienteering and ski orienteering competitor and runner
- Michel Wyder (1950–1986), Swiss rally co-driver
- Peter Wyder (1934–2024), Swiss physicist
- Romed Wyder (born 1967), Swiss filmmaker
