= Advanced superionic conductor =

Electric-conducting material with near-optimal ion transport

An advanced superionic conductor (AdSIC) in materials science, is a fast ion conductor that has a crystal structure close to optimal for fast ion transport (FIT).

== History ==
The term was introduced in a paper by A. L. Despotuli, A. V. Andreeva and B. Rambaby.

== Characteristics ==
The rigid ion sublattice of Advanced SuperIonic Conductors (AdSICs) has structure channels where mobile ions of opposite sign migrate. Their ion-transport characteristics display ionic conductivity of ~0.3/Ω cm (RbAg_{4}I_{5}, 300 K) and activation energy of E_{i}~0.1 eV. This determines the temperature-dependent concentration of mobile ions ni~Ni x e^{Ei/kBT} capable to migrate in conduction channels at each moment (Ni~10^{22}/cm^{3}, ni~2×10^{20}/cm^{3}, 300 K).

The Rubidium silver iodide–family is a group of AdSIC compounds and solid solutions that are isostructural with the RbAg_{4}I_{5} alpha modification. Examples of such compounds with mobile Ag^{+}- and Cu^{+}-cations include KAg_{4}I_{5}, NH_{4}Ag_{4}I_{5}, K_{1−x}Cs_{x}Ag_{4}I_{5}, Rb_{1−x}Cs_{x}Ag_{4}I_{5}, CsAg_{4}Br_{1−x}I_{2+x}, CsAg_{4}ClBr_{2}I_{2}, CsAg_{4}Cl_{3}I_{2}, RbCu_{4}Cl_{3}I_{2} and KCu_{4}I_{5.}

RbAg_{4}I_{5} AdSIC displays peculiar features of crystal structure and dynamics of mobile ions.

Recently, all solid state micrometre-sized supercapacitors based on AdSICs (nanoionic supercapacitors) had been recognized as critical electron component of future sub-voltage and deep-sub-voltage nanoelectronics and related technologies (22 nm technological node of CMOS and beyond). Researchers also developed an all-solid-state battery employing RbAg_{4}I_{5} superionic conductor.
