= Fast ion conductor =

Solid conductor with highly mobile ions

A proton conductor, specifically, superionic ice, in a static electric field.

In materials science, fast ion conductors are solid conductors with highly mobile ions. These materials are important in the area of solid-state ionics, and are also known as solid electrolytes and superionic conductors. These materials are useful in batteries and various sensors. Fast ion conductors are used primarily in solid oxide fuel cells. As solid electrolytes, they allow the movement of ions without the need for a liquid or soft membrane separating the electrodes. The phenomenon relies on the hopping of ions through an otherwise rigid crystal structure.

== Mechanism ==
Fast ion conductors are intermediate in nature between crystalline solids, which possess a regular structure with immobile ions, and liquid electrolytes, which have no regular structure and fully mobile ions. Solid electrolytes find use in all solid-state supercapacitors, batteries, and fuel cells, and in various kinds of chemical sensors.

== Classification ==
In solid electrolytes (glasses or crystals), the ionic conductivity σ_{i} can have any value, but it should be much larger than the electronic one. Usually, solids where σ_{i} is on the order of 0.0001 to 0.1 Ω^{−1} cm^{−1} (at 300 K) are called superionic conductors.

=== Proton conductors ===
Proton conductors are a special class of solid electrolytes, where hydrogen ions act as charge carriers. One notable example is superionic water.

=== Superionic conductors ===
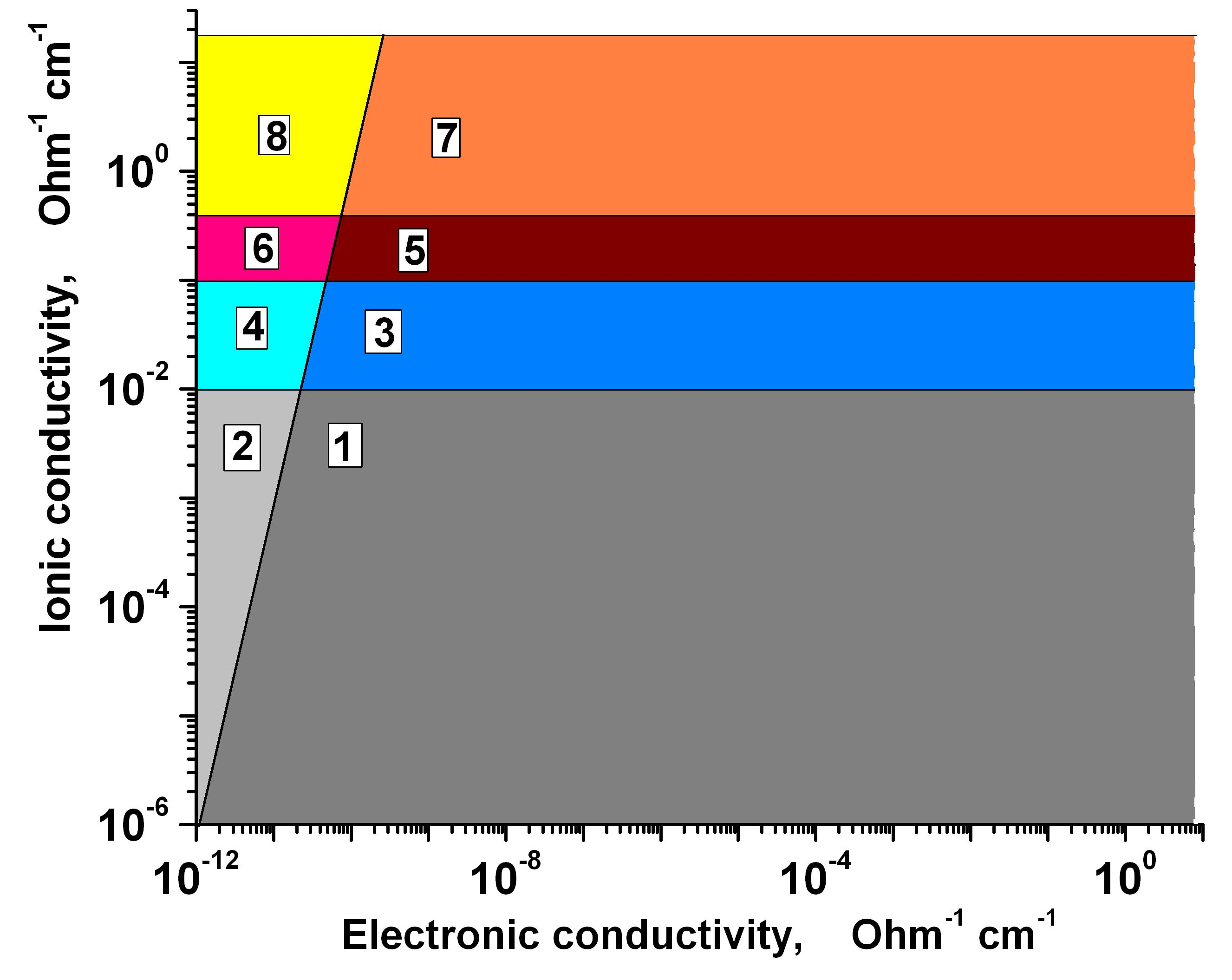
Classification of solid-state ionic conductors by the electronic conductivity – ionic conductivity diagram. Regions 2, 4, 6 and 8 are solid electrolytes (SEs), materials with σ_{i} ≫ σ_{e}; regions 1, 3, 5 and 7 are mixed ion-electron conductors (MIECs). 3 and 4 are superionic conductors (SICs), i.e. materials with σ_{i} > 0.001 Ω^{−1} cm^{−1}. 5 and 6 are advanced superionic conductors (AdSICs), where σ_{i} > 10^{−1} Ω^{−1}cm^{−1} (300 K), energy activation E_{i} about 0.1 eV. 7 and 8 are hypothetical AdSIC with E_{i} ≈ k_{B}T ≈ 0.03 eV (300 К).

Superionic conductors where σ_{i} is more than 0.1 Ω^{−1} cm^{−1} and the activation energy for ion transport E_{i} is small (about 0.1 eV), are called advanced superionic conductors. The most famous example of advanced superionic conductor-solid electrolyte is RbAg_{4}I_{5}, where σ_{i} > 0.25 Ω^{−1} cm^{−1} and σ_{e} ~ 10^{−9} Ω^{−1} cm^{−1} at 300 K. The Hall (drift) ionic mobility in RbAg_{4}I_{5} is about 2×10^{−4} cm^{2}/(V⋅s) at room temperatures. The σ_{e}–σ_{i} systematic diagram distinguishing the different types of solid-state ionic conductors is given in the figure.

No clear examples have been described yet of fast ion conductors in the hypothetical advanced superionic conductors class (areas 7 and 8 in the classification plot). However, in crystal structure of several superionic conductors, e.g. in the minerals of the pearceite–polybasite group, the large structural fragments with activation energy of ion transport E_{i} < k_{B}T (at 300 К) had been discovered in 2006.

== Examples ==
=== Zirconia-based materials ===
A common solid electrolyte is yttria-stabilized zirconia, YSZ. This material is prepared by doping Y_{2}O_{3} into ZrO_{2}. Oxide ions typically migrate only slowly in solid Y_{2}O_{3} and in ZrO_{2}, but in YSZ, the conductivity of oxide increases dramatically. These materials are used to allow oxygen to move through the solid in certain kinds of fuel cells. Zirconium dioxide can also be doped with calcium oxide to give an oxide conductor that is used in oxygen sensors in automobile controls. Upon doping only a few percent, the diffusion constant of oxide increases by a factor of ~1000.

Other conductive ceramics function as ion conductors. One example is NASICON, (Na_{3}Zr_{2}Si_{2}PO_{12}), a sodium super-ionic conductor

=== Beta-alumina ===
Another example of a popular fast ion conductor is beta-alumina solid electrolyte. Unlike the usual forms of alumina, this modification has a layered structure with open galleries separated by pillars. Sodium ions (Na^{+}) migrate through this material readily since the oxide framework provides an ionophilic, non-reducible medium. This material is considered as the sodium ion conductor for the sodium–sulfur battery.

=== Fluoride ion conductors ===
Lanthanum trifluoride (LaF_{3}) is conductive for F^{−} ions, used in some ion selective electrodes. Beta-lead fluoride exhibits a continuous growth of conductivity on heating. This property was first discovered by Michael Faraday.

=== Iodides ===
A textbook example of a fast ion conductor is silver iodide (AgI). Upon heating the solid to 146 °C, this material adopts the alpha-polymorph. In this form, the iodide ions form a rigid cubic framework, and the Ag+ centers are molten. The electrical conductivity of the solid increases by 4000x. Similar behavior is observed for copper(I) iodide (CuI), rubidium silver iodide (RbAg_{4}I_{5}), and Ag_{2}HgI_{4}.

=== Other Inorganic materials ===
- Silver sulfide, conductive for Ag^{+} ions, used in some ion selective electrodes
- Lead(II) chloride, conductive for Cl^{−} ions at higher temperatures
- Some perovskite ceramics – strontium titanate, strontium stannate – conductive for O^{2−} ions
- $\ce{Zr(HPO4)2.\mathit{n}H2O}$ – conductive for H^{+} ions
- $\ce{UO2HPO4.4H2O}$ (hydrogen uranyl phosphate tetrahydrate) – conductive for H^{+} ions
- Cerium(IV) oxide – conductive for O^{2−} ions

=== Organic materials ===
- Many gels, such polyacrylamides, agar, etc. are fast ion conductors
- A salt dissolved in a polymer – e.g. lithium perchlorate in polyethylene oxide
- Polyelectrolytes and Ionomers – e.g. Nafion, a H^{+} conductor

== History ==
The important case of fast ionic conduction is one in a surface space-charge layer of ionic crystals. Such conduction was first predicted by Kurt Lehovec. As a space-charge layer has nanometer thickness, the effect is directly related to nanoionics (nanoionics-I). Lehovec's effect is used as a basis for developing nanomaterials for portable lithium batteries and fuel cells.

== See also ==
- Solid-state electrolyte
- Mixed conductor
