= Robert Cava =

American chemist (born 1951)

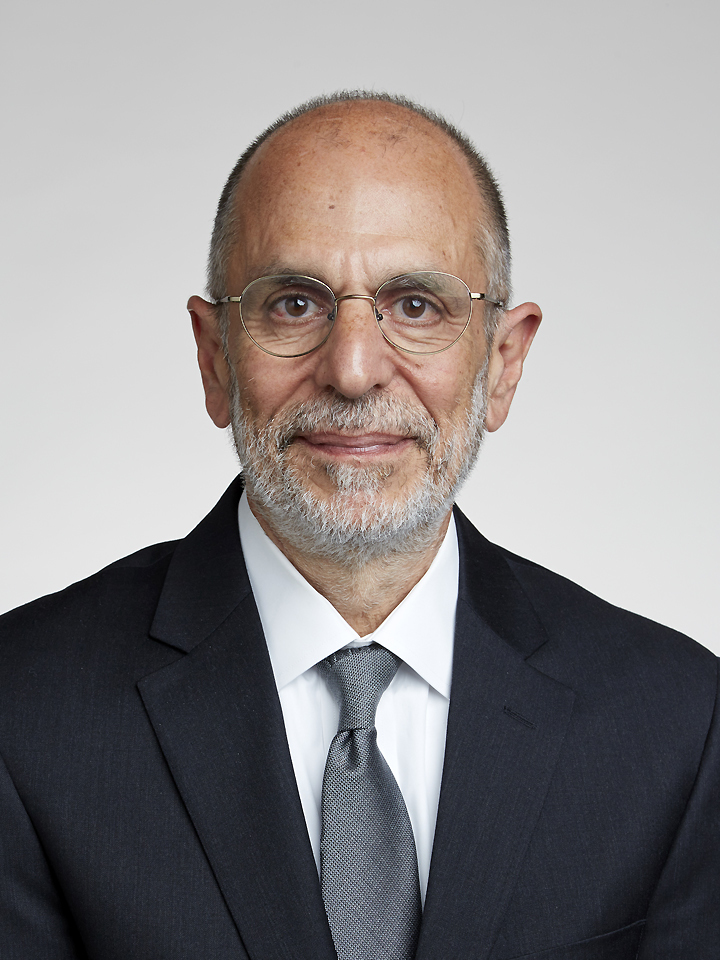
- Cava in 2016
- Born: 1951 (age 74–75)
- Education: Massachusetts Institute of Technology
- Awards: Linus Pauling Award (2012); James C. McGroddy Prize for New Materials (2012); Humboldt Prize (2011); John J. Carty Award for the Advancement of Science (2005); Member of the National Academy of Sciences (2001)
- Scientific career
- Fields: Solid-state chemistry
- Workplaces: Princeton University; Bell Labs
- Thesis: A study of the mobile ions in several binary fast ion conductors (1978)
- Doctoral advisor: Bernhardt J. Wuensch
- Doctoral students: Leslie Schoop
- Other notable students: Hemamala Karunadasa
- Website: chemistry.princeton.edu/faculty/cava

Robert Joseph Cava (born 1951) is a solid-state chemist at Princeton University where he holds the title Russell Wellman Moore Professor of Chemistry. Previously, Professor Cava worked as a staff scientist at Bell labs from 1979–1996, where earned the title of Distinguished Member of the Technical Staff. As of 2016 his research investigates topological insulators, semimetals, superconductors, frustrated magnets and thermoelectrics.

== Education ==
Cava was educated at the Massachusetts Institute of Technology (MIT) where he was awarded Bachelor of Science and Master of Science degrees in Materials Science and Engineering in 1974 followed by a PhD in ceramics in 1978. His PhD was supervised by Bernhardt J. Wuensch and investigated the electrical mobility of ions in fast ion conductors.

== Career and research ==
In his career, he has published over 500 peer-reviewed papers, 36 of them in Nature and 8 of them in Science. These papers have been cited over 30,000 times, including his seminal work on Ba_{2}YCu_{3}O_{9−δ} (YBCO), which has been cited almost 1500 times. He holds 15 patents.

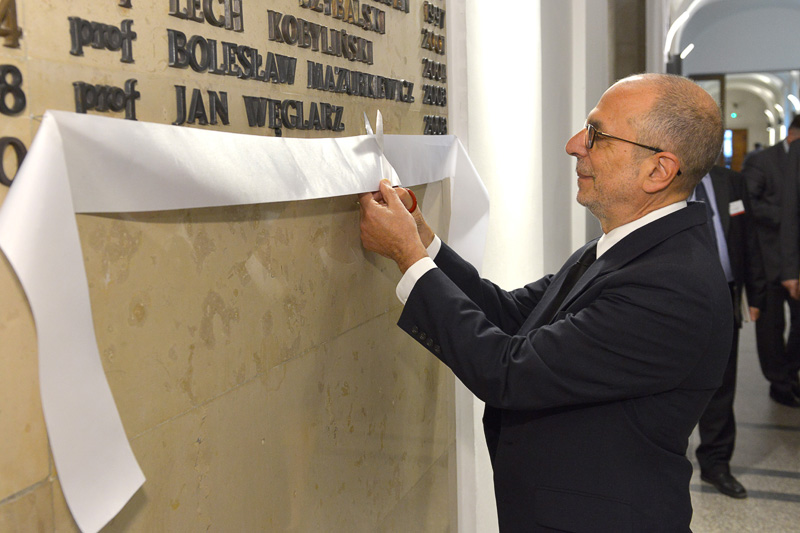
Professor Robert J. Cava during the ceremony of receiving the Doctor Honoris Causa degree from the Gdańsk University of Technology

His former doctoral students include Leslie Schoop.

=== Honors and awards ===
In recognition of his contributions, he was elected in 1988 a fellow of the American Institute of Physics and a Fellow of the American Physical Society. He was elected in 2001 a Member of the National Academy of Sciences who specifically acknowledged his mastery of the ternary and quaternary oxides that produced materials possessing high-temperature superconductivity.

In 1996 Cava received the Bernd T. Matthias Prize for new superconducting materials. He received in 2011 the Humboldt Prize and in 2012 the Linus Pauling Award. In 2014 he received a Doctor Honoris Causa degree from the Gdańsk University of Technology. Cava also won the 2021 David Adler Lectureship Award in the Field of Materials Physics. In addition to research, Cava's ability to connect with students while teaching has earned him several teaching awards, including the Fall 2002 Excellence in Teaching Award from Princeton University.

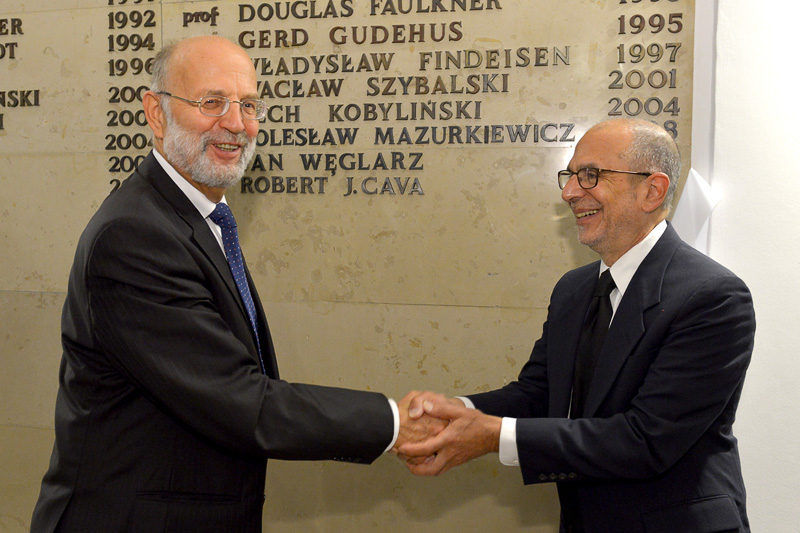
Professor Robert J. Cava and rector of the Gdańsk University of Technology, Professor Henryk Krawczyk, during the ceremony of receiving the Doctor Honoris Causa degree

He was elected a Foreign Member of the Royal Society (ForMemRS) in 2016.

== Personal life ==
His biography at the Gdańsk University of Technology describes him as a New Yorker, dedicated supporter of the New York Yankees, passionate astronomer and amateur brewer.
