= Magalí Lingenfelder =

Argentinian chemist

- Education: National University of Córdoba; Max Planck Institute for Solid State Research
- Awards: Otto Hahn Medal (2008)
- Scientific career
- Fields: BioNanoarchitectonics; Self-assembly; Scanning probe microscopy Chirality; Surface science
- Workplaces: Molecular Foundry; ICMAB; École Polytechnique Fédérale de Lausanne
- Thesis: Chiral recognition and supramolecular self-assembly of adsorbed amino acids and dipeptides at the submolecular level (2008)
- Doctoral advisor: Klaus Kern
- Website: lingenfelder-lab.com

Magalí Lingenfelder is an Argentinian-Swiss chemist who led the Max Planck Laboratory for Molecular Nanoscience in École Polytechnique Fédérale de Lausanne. Her work looks to control atomic interfaces for energy conversion and antimicrobial surfaces. She was awarded the Max Planck Society Otto Hahn Medal in 2008.

== Early life and education ==
Lingenfelder is from Argentina. She was an undergraduate student at the National University of Córdoba. She completed her Master's thesis at the Max Planck Institute for Solid State Research, where she worked on metal-organic coordination complexes. She remained in Germany for her doctoral research, for which she was awarded the Otto Hahn Medal in 2008. Her doctoral research investigated sub-molecular resolution of chiral recognition processes.

== Research and career ==
After her PhD, Lingenfelder was a postdoctoral researcher at the Spanish National Research Council Institute of Materials Sciences of Barcelona (Instituto de Ciencia de Materiales de Barcelona) and the Molecular Foundry. In 2013, Lingenfelder joined the École Polytechnique Fédérale de Lausanne. Her research investigates the development of carefully controlled molecular assemblies which can respond to external stimuli. Typically, these interactions are determined by energy or charge transfer processes.

Lingenfelder showed that it was possible to boost the oxygen evolution reaction (OER) in electrocatalytic water-splitting by functionalising hybrid 2D electrodes with helicene molecules. Specifically, she evaluated the role of chirality by comparing the impact of chiral fused thiadiazole-helicene molecules with 2,1,3-benzothiadiazole, an achiral molecule, on oxygen evolution reactions. She showed that the boost in OER was not solely due to interactions between the thiadiazoles and electrode surfaces. This study also confirmed previously claims of Chiral Induced Spin Selectivity ('CISS') explains that hydrogen peroxide formation is prohibited at spin polarising surfaces.

=== Selected publications ===
Her publications include:

- Emergence of Potential-Controlled Cu-Nanocuboids and Graphene-Covered Cu-Nanocuboids under Operando CO2 Electroreduction
- Contrasting chemistry of block copolymer films controls the dynamics of protein self-assembly at the nanoscale
- Local Conformational Switching of Supramolecular Networks at the Solid/Liquid Interface
- Germanene: the germanium analogue of graphene

=== Awards and honours ===
- 2008 Max Planck Society Otto Hahn Medal
- 2018 Royal Society of Chemistry collection "Celebrating Excellence in Research: 100 Women of Chemistry"
- Scientific coordinator of the Argentine Scientists Network in Switzerland, named by the Argentine Minister of Science
