= Solid State Ionics =

- Discipline: Solid state ionics
- Language: English
- Edited by: Joachim Maier

Publication details
- History: 1980–present
- Publisher: Elsevier
- Frequency: Monthly and more
- Impact factor: 3.7 (2025)

Standard abbreviations
- ISO 4: Solid State Ion.

Indexing
- CODEN: SSIOD3
- ISSN: 0167-2738 (print); 1872-7689 (web)
- LCCN: 80648376
- OCLC no.: 888489052

Links
- Journal homepage; Online access

Solid State Ionics is a monthly peer-reviewed scientific journal published by Elsevier. Established in 1980, it covers all aspects of diffusion and mass transport in solids, with a particular focus on defects in solids, intercalation, corrosion, oxidation, sintering, and ion transport. The journal has an irregular publication frequency, having one or two releases per month, with additional conference proceedings; each release may be one issue, multiple issues or one volume. The editor-in-chief is Joachim Maier (Max Planck Institute for Solid State Research).

== Abstracting and indexing ==
The journal is abstracted and indexed in:

- CAB Abstracts
- Chemical Abstracts Service
- Current Contents/Physics, Chemical, & Earth Sciences
- EI/Compendex Plus
- GeoRef
- Inspec
- METADEX
- Science Citation Index
- Scopus

According to the Journal Citation Reports, the journal has a 2025 impact factor of 3.7.
