= Solid-state ionics =

Branch of electrochemistry

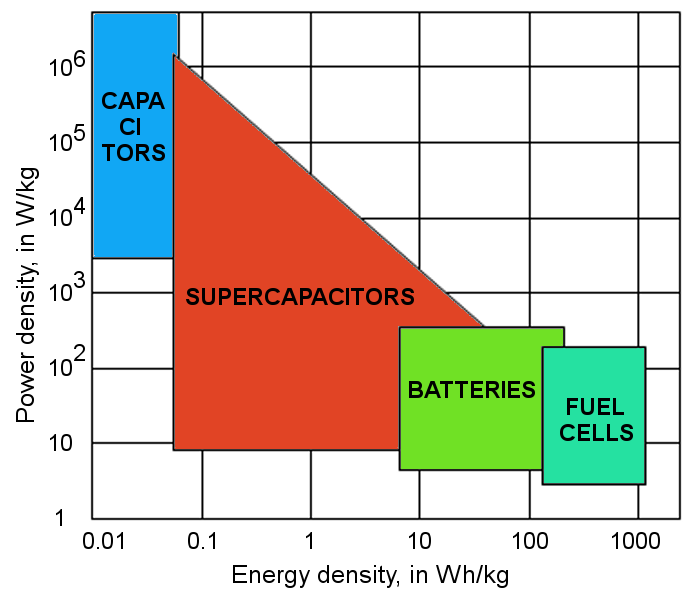
Power density vs. energy density for different classes of solid-state ionics systems used for energy storage and conversion

Solid-state ionics is the study of ionic–electronic mixed conductor and fully ionic conductors (solid electrolytes) and their uses. Some materials that fall into this category include inorganic crystalline and polycrystalline solids, ceramics, glasses, polymers, and composites. Solid-state ionic devices, such as solid oxide fuel cells, can be much more reliable and long-lasting, especially under harsh conditions, than comparable devices with fluid electrolytes.

The field of solid-state ionics was first developed in Europe, starting with the work of Michael Faraday on solid electrolytes Ag_{2}S and PbF_{2} in 1834. Fundamental contributions were later made by Walther Nernst, who derived the Nernst equation and detected ionic conduction in heterovalently doped zirconia, which he applied in his Nernst lamp. Another major step forward was the characterization of silver iodide in 1914. Around 1930, the concept of point defects was established by Yakov Frenkel, Walter Schottky and Carl Wagner, including the development of point-defect thermodynamics by Schottky and Wagner; this helped explain ionic and electronic transport in ionic crystals, ion-conducting glasses, polymer electrolytes and nanocomposites. In the late 20th and early 21st centuries, solid-state ionics focused on the synthesis and characterization of novel solid electrolytes and their applications in solid state battery systems, fuel cells and sensors.

The term solid-state ionics was coined in 1967 by Takehiko Takahashi, but did not become widely used until the 1980s, with the emergence of the journal Solid State Ionics. The first international conference on this topic was held in 1972 in Belgirate, Italy, under the name "Fast Ion Transport in Solids, Solid State Batteries and Devices".

== History ==
=== Foundations ===
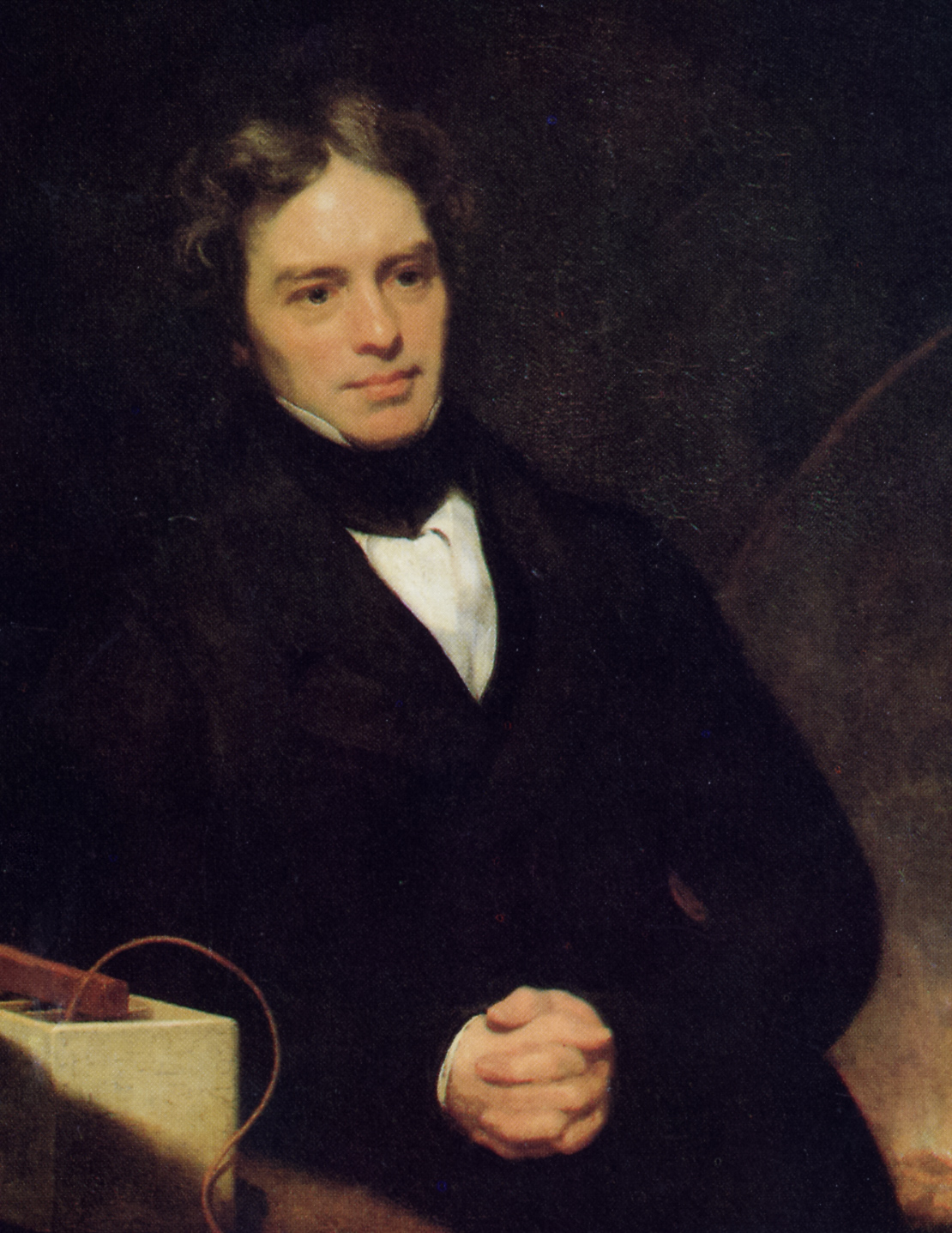
Michael Faraday in 1842

In the early 1830s, Michael Faraday laid the foundations of electrochemistry and solid-state ionics by discovering the motion of ions in liquid and solid electrolytes. Earlier, around 1800, Alessandro Volta used a liquid electrolyte in his voltaic pile, the first electrochemical battery, but failed to realize that ions are involved in the process. Meanwhile, in his work on decomposition of solutions by electric current, Faraday used not only the ideas of ion, cation, anion, electrode, anode, cathode, electrolyte and electrolysis, but even the present-day terms for them. Faraday associated electric current in an electrolyte with the motion of ions and discovered that ions can exchange their charges with an electrode while they were transformed into elements by electrolysis. He quantified those processes by two laws of electrolysis. The first law (1832) stated that the mass Δm of a product at the electrode increases linearly with the amount of charge Δq passed through the electrolyte. The second law (1833) established the proportionality between Δm and the "electrochemical equivalent" and defined the Faraday constant F as F = (Δq/Δm)(M/z), where M is the molar mass, and z is the charge of the ion.

In 1834, Faraday discovered ionic conductivity in heated solid electrolytes Ag_{2}S and PbF_{2}. In PbF_{2}, the conductivity increase upon heating was not sudden, but spread over a hundred degrees Celsius. Such behavior, called Faraday transition, is observed in the cation conductors Na_{2}S and Li_{4}SiO_{4} and anion conductors PbF_{2}, CaF_{2}, SrF_{2}, SrCl_{2} and LaF_{3}.

Later in 1891, Johann Wilhelm Hittorf reported on the ion transport numbers in electrochemical cells, and in the early 20th century those numbers were determined for solid electrolytes.

=== First theories and applications ===
The voltaic pile stimulated a series of improved batteries, such as the Daniell cell, fuel cell and lead acid battery. Their operation was largely understood in the late 1800s from the theories by Wilhelm Ostwald and Walther Nernst. In 1894 Ostwald explained the energy conversion in a fuel cell and stressed that its efficiency was not limited by thermodynamics. Ostwald, together with Jacobus Henricus van 't Hoff, and Svante Arrhenius, was a founding father of electrochemistry and chemical ionic theory, and received a Nobel prize in chemistry in 1909.

His work was continued by Walther Nernst, who derived the Nernst equation and described ionic conduction in heterovalently doped zirconia, which he used in his Nernst lamp. Nernst was inspired by the dissociation theory of Arrhenius published in 1887, which relied on ions in solution. In 1889 he realized the similarity between electrochemical and chemical equilibria, and formulated his equation that correctly predicted the output voltage of various electrochemical cells based on liquid electrolytes from the thermodynamic properties of their components.

Besides his theoretical work, in 1897 Nernst patented the first lamp that used a solid electrolyte. Contrary to the existing carbon-filament lamps, Nernst lamp could operate in air and was twice more efficient as its emission spectrum was closer to that of daylight. AEG, a lighting company in Berlin, bought the Nernst's patent for one million German gold marks, which was a fortune at the time, and used 800 of Nernst lamps to illuminate their booth at the world's fair Exposition Universelle (1900).

=== Ionic conductivity in silver halides ===
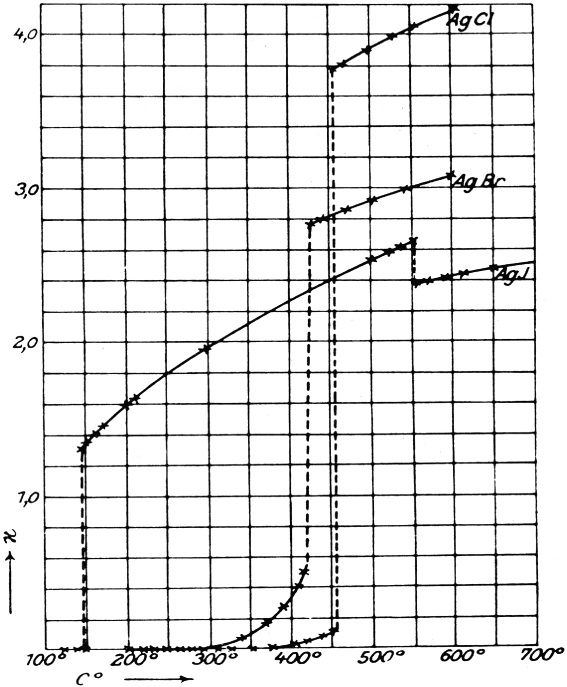
Temperature-dependent ionic conductivity of silver halides, original graph by Tubandt and Lorenz

Among several solid electrolytes described in the 19th and early 20th century, α-AgI, the high-temperature crystalline form of silver iodide, is widely regarded as the most important one. Its electrical conduction was characterized by Carl Tubandt and E. Lorenz in 1914. Their comparative study of AgI, AgCl and AgBr demonstrated that α-AgI, is thermally stable and highly conductive between 147 and 555 °C; the conductivity weakly increased with temperature in this range and then dropped upon melting. This behavior was fully reversible and excluded non-equilibrium effects. Tubandt and Lorenz described other materials with a similar behavior, such as α-CuI, α-CuBr, β-CuBr, and high-temperature phases of Ag_{2}S, Ag_{2}Se and Ag_{2}Te. They associated the conductivity with cations in silver and cuprous halides and with ions and electrons in silver chalcogenides.

=== Point defects in ionic crystals ===
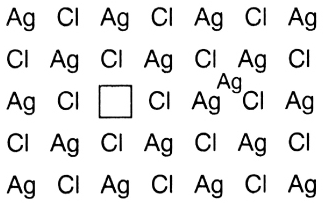
Frenkel defect in AgCl

In 1926, Yakov Frenkel suggested that in an ionic crystal like AgI, in thermodynamic equilibrium, a small fraction α of the cations are displaced from their regular lattice sites into interstitial positions. He related α with the Gibbs energy ΔG for the formation of one mole of Frenkel pairs as α = exp(−ΔG/2RT), where T is temperature, and R is the gas constant; for a typical value of ΔG = 100 kJ/mol, α ~ 1×10^{−6} at 100 °C and ~6×10^{−4} at 400 °C. This idea naturally explained the presence of an appreciable fraction of mobile ions in otherwise defect-free ionic crystals, and thus the ionic conductivity in them.

Frenkel's idea was expanded by Carl Wagner and Walter Schottky in their 1929 theory, which described the equilibrium thermodynamics of point defects in ionic crystals. In particular, Wagner and Schottky related the deviations from stoichiometry in those crystals with the chemical potentials of the crystal components and explained the phenomenon of mixed electronic and ionic conduction.

Wagner and Schottky considered four extreme cases of point-defect disorder in a stoichiometric binary ionic crystal of type AB:

1. Pairs of interstitial cations A^{+} and lattice vacancies (Frenkel defects)
2. Pairs of interstitial anions B^{−} and lattice vacancies (anti-Frenkel defects)
3. Pairs of interstitial cations A^{+} and interstitial anions B^{−} with no vacancies
4. Pairs of A- and B-type lattice vacancies with no interstitials (Schottky disorder).

Type-3 disorder does not occur in practice, and type 2 is observed only in rare cases when anions are smaller than cations, while both types 1 and 4 are common and show the same exp(−ΔG/2RT) temperature dependence.

Later in 1933, Wagner suggested that in metal oxides an excess of metal would result in extra electrons, while a deficit of metal would produce electron holes, i.e., that atomic non-stoichiometry would result in a mixed ionic–electronic conduction.

=== Other types of disorder ===
==== Ionic glasses ====
The studies of crystalline ionic conductors where excess ions were provided by point defect continued through 1950s, and the specific mechanism of conduction was established for each compound depending on its ionic structure. The emergence of glassy and polymeric electrolytes in the late 1970s provided new ionic conduction mechanisms. A relatively wide range of conductivities was attained in glasses, wherein mobile ions were dynamically decoupled from the matrix. It was found that the conductivity could be increased by doping a glass with certain salts, or by using a glass mixture. The conductivity values could be as high as 0.03 S/cm at room temperature, with activation energies as low as 20 kJ/mol. Compared to crystals, glasses have isotropic properties, continuously tunable composition and good workability; they lack the detrimental grain boundaries and can be molded into any shape, but understanding their ionic transport was complicated by the lack of long-range order.

Historically, an evidence for ionic conductivity was provided back in the 1880s, when German scientists noticed that a well-calibrated thermometer made of Thuringian glass would show −0.5 °C instead of 0 °C when placed in ice shortly after immersion in boiling water, and recover only after several months. In 1883, they reduced this effect 10 times by replacing a mixture of sodium and potassium in the glass by either sodium or potassium. This finding helped Otto Schott develop the first accurate lithium-based thermometer. More systematic studies on ionic conductivity in glass appeared in 1884, but received broad attention only a century later. Several universal laws have been empirically formulated for ionic glasses and extended to other ionic conductors, such as the frequency dependence of electrical conductivity σ(ν) − σ(0) ~ ν^{p}, where the exponent p depends on the material, but not on temperature, at least below ~100 K. This behavior is a fingerprint of activated hopping conduction among nearby sites.

==== Polymer electrolytes ====
In 1975, Peter V. Wright, a polymer chemist from Sheffield (UK), produced the first polymer electrolyte, which contained sodium and potassium salts in a polyethylene oxide (PEO) matrix. Later another type of polymer electrolytes, polyelectrolyte, was put forward, where ions moved through an electrically charged, rather than neutral, polymer matrix. Polymer electrolytes showed lower conductivities than glasses, but they were cheaper, much more flexible and could be easier machined and shaped into various forms. While ionic glasses are typically operated below, polymer conductors are typically heated above their glass transition temperatures. Consequently, both the electric field and mechanical deformation decay on a similar time scale in polymers, but not in glasses. Between 1983 and 2001 it was believed that the amorphous fraction is responsible for ionic conductivity, i.e., that (nearly) complete structural disorder is essential for the fast ionic transport in polymers. However, a number of crystalline polymers have been described in 2001 and later with ionic conductivity as high as 0.01 S/cm at 30 °C and activation energy of only 0.24 eV.

==== Nanostructures ====
In the 1970s–1980s, it was realized that nanosized systems may affect ionic conductivity, opening a new field of nanoionics. In 1973, it was reported that ionic conductivity of lithium iodide (LiI) crystals could be increased 50 times by adding to it a fine powder of insulating material (alumina). This effect was reproduced in the 1980s in Ag and Tl halides doped with alumina nanoparticles. Similarly, addition of insulating nanoparticles helped increase the conductivity of ionic polymers. These unexpected results were explained by charge separation at the matrix–nanoparticle interface that provided additional conductive channels to the matrix, and the small size of the filler particles was required to increase the area of this interface. Similar charge-separation effects were observed for grain boundaries in crystalline ionic conductors.

== Applications ==
By 1971, solid-state cells and batteries based on rubidium silver iodide (RbAg_{4}I_{5}) have been designed and tested in a wide range of temperatures and discharge currents. Despite the relatively high conductivity of RbAg_{4}I_{5}, they have never been commercialized due to a low overall specific energy (about 5 W·h/kg). On the contrary, LiI, which had a conductivity of only about 1×10^{−7} S/cm at room temperature, found a wide-scale application in batteries for artificial pacemakers. The first such device, based on undoped LiI, was implanted into a human in March 1972 in Ferrara, Italy. Later models used as electrolyte a film of LiI, which was doped with alumina nanoparticles to increase its conductivity. LiI was formed in an in situ chemical reaction between the Li anode and iodine-poly(2-vinylpyridine) cathode, and therefore was self-healed from erosion and cracks during the operation.

Sodium–sulfur cells, based on ceramic β-Al_{2}O_{3} electrolyte sandwiched between molten-sodium anode and molten-sulfur cathode showed high energy densities and were considered for car batteries in the 1990s, but disregarded due to the brittleness of alumina, which resulted in cracks and critical failure due to reaction between molten sodium and sulfur. Replacement of β-Al_{2}O_{3} with NASICON did not save this application because it did not solve the cracking problem, and because NASICON reacted with the molten sodium.

Yttria-stabilized zirconia is used as a solid electrolyte in oxygen sensors in cars, generating voltage that depends on the ratio of oxygen and exhaust gas and providing electronic feedback to the fuel injector. Such sensors are also installed at many metallurgical and glass-making factories. Similar sensors of CO_{2}, chlorine and other gases based on solid silver halide electrolytes have been proposed in the 1980s–1990s. Since mid-1980s, a Li-based solid electrolyte is used to separate the electrochromic film (typically WO_{3}) and ion-storing film (typically LiCoO_{2}) in the smart glass, a window whose transparency is controlled by external voltage.

Solid-state ionic conductors are essential components of lithium-ion batteries, proton exchange membrane fuel cells (PEMFCs), supercapacitors, a novel class of electrochemical energy storage devices, and solid oxide fuel cells, devices that produces electricity from oxidizing a fuel. Nafion, a flexible fluoropolymer-copolymer discovered in the late 1960s, is widely used as a polymer electrolyte in PEMFCs.

== See also ==
- Solid-state battery
