= Jochen Mannhart =

German physicist

Jochen Mannhart (born 24 April 1960 in Metzingen) is a German physicist.

== Biography ==
Jochen Mannhart studied physics at the University of Tübingen, Germany, from 1980 to 1986, where he also received his PhD in 1987 and his habilitation in 1994.

From 1987 to 1989, he was a visiting scientist at the IBM Thomas J. Watson Research Center in Yorktown Heights, NY. From 1989 to 1996, he was a research staff member at the IBM Zurich Research Laboratory, where he was manager of the New Materials and Heterostructures research group. From 1996 to 2011, he was a chaired professor at the Center for Electronic Correlations and Magnetism at the University of Augsburg, Germany.

Since the summer of 2011, he has been a director of the Max Planck Institute for Solid State Research in Stuttgart, where he is head of the Solid State Quantum Electronics department.

=== Prizes and awards ===
The 2014 European Physical Society Condensed Matter Division Europhysics Prize is awarded to Jochen Mannhart. He was the 2008 recipient of the Gottfried Wilhelm Leibniz Prize of the Deutsche Forschungsgemeinschaft (German Research Society, DFG), award endowment 2.5 million euros, for his research in the field of experimental solid-state physics. In 1986, he received the Friedrich Forster Prize of the University of Tübingen, Germany.

=== Research ===
Mannhart's research includes the fabrication of novel all-oxide field-effect transistors, in which phase changes can be switched at interface layers, including phase changes to superconductivity. Under his leadership, his research group has developed an improved scanning probe microscope (frequency-modulated lateral force microscopy), which features a resolution of 77 picometers. With this instrument, his group succeeded in imaging individual atoms with subatomic resolution, which was used, for example, to investigate the atomic mechanism of friction. With P. Chaudhari and D. Dimos, J. Mannhart revealed that grain alignment is key to the fabrication of high-temperature superconductors with useful critical currents, so that they are suitable for practical applications such as modern high-T_{c} superconducting cables. In 2019, his group discovered Thermal Laser Epitaxy (TLE), a new epitaxy technique that uses continuous-wave laser to evaporate sources of material which then condense upon a substrate. Another research area is thermoelectronic generators.

=== Key publications ===
- Li, Lu; Richter, C.; Paetel, S.; Kopp, T.; Mannhart, J.; Ashoori, R. C. (13 May 2011). "Very Large Capacitance Enhancement in a Two-Dimensional Electron System". Science. 332 (6031): 825–828. arXiv:1006.2847. Bibcode:2011Sci...332..825L. doi:10.1126/science.1204168. ISSN 0036-8075. PMID 21566188. S2CID 14663369.
- Mannhart, J.; Schlom, D. G. (26 March 2010). "Oxide Interfaces—An Opportunity for Electronics". Science. 327 (5973). American Association for the Advancement of Science (AAAS): 1607–1611. Bibcode:2010Sci...327.1607M. doi:10.1126/science.1181862. ISSN 0036-8075. PMID 20339065. S2CID 206523419.
- Cen, Cheng; Thiel, Stefan; Mannhart, Jochen; Levy, Jeremy (20 February 2009). "Oxide Nanoelectronics on Demand". Science. 323 (5917). American Association for the Advancement of Science (AAAS): 1026–1030. Bibcode:2009Sci...323.1026C. doi:10.1126/science.1168294. ISSN 0036-8075. PMID 19229030. S2CID 32623248.
- Loder, F.; Kampf, A. P.; Kopp, T.; Mannhart, J.; Schneider, C. W.; Barash, Y. S. (16 December 2007). "Magnetic flux periodicity of h/e in superconducting loops". Nature Physics. 4 (2). Springer Science and Business Media LLC: 112–115. arXiv:0709.4111. doi:10.1038/nphys813. ISSN 1745-2473.
- Reyren, N.; Thiel, S.; Caviglia, A. D.; Kourkoutis, L. Fitting; Hammerl, G.; Richter, C.; Schneider, C. W.; Kopp, T.; Rüetschi, A.-S.; Jaccard, D.; Gabay, M.; Muller, D. A.; Triscone, J.-M.; Mannhart, J. (31 August 2007). "Superconducting Interfaces Between Insulating Oxides" (PDF). Science. 317 (5842). American Association for the Advancement of Science (AAAS): 1196–1199. Bibcode:2007Sci...317.1196R. doi:10.1126/science.1146006. ISSN 0036-8075. PMID 17673621. S2CID 22212323.
- Thiel, S.; Hammerl, G.; Schmehl, A.; Schneider, C. W.; Mannhart, J. (29 September 2006). "Tunable Quasi-Two-Dimensional Electron Gases in Oxide Heterostructures". Science. 313 (5795). American Association for the Advancement of Science (AAAS): 1942–1945. Bibcode:2006Sci...313.1942T. doi:10.1126/science.1131091. ISSN 0036-8075. PMID 16931719. S2CID 31701967.
- Herz, M.; Giessibl, F. J.; Mannhart, J. (1 July 2003). "Probing the shape of atoms in real space". Physical Review B. 68 (4) 045301. arXiv:cond-mat/0305103. Bibcode:2003PhRvB..68d5301H. doi:10.1103/physrevb.68.045301. ISSN 0163-1829. S2CID 43054031.
- Giessibl, F. J.; Herz, M.; Mannhart, J. (27 August 2002). "Friction traced to the single atom". Proceedings of the National Academy of Sciences. 99 (19): 12006–12010. Bibcode:2002PNAS...9912006G. doi:10.1073/pnas.182160599. ISSN 0027-8424. PMC 129388. PMID 12198180.
- Giessibl, Franz J.; Hembacher, S.; Bielefeldt, H.; Mannhart, J. (21 July 2000). "Subatomic Features on the Silicon (111)-(7×7) Surface Observed by Atomic Force Microscopy" (PDF). Science. 289 (5478). American Association for the Advancement of Science (AAAS): 422–425. Bibcode:2000Sci...289..422G. doi:10.1126/science.289.5478.422. ISSN 0036-8075. PMID 10903196.
- Dimos, D.; Chaudhari, P.; Mannhart, J.; LeGoues, F. K. (11 July 1988). "Orientation Dependence of Grain-Boundary Critical Currents inYBa2Cu3O7−δBicrystals". Physical Review Letters. 61 (2). American Physical Society (APS): 219–222. doi:10.1103/physrevlett.61.219. ISSN 0031-9007. PMID 10039063.
- Mannhart, J.; Bosch, J.; Gross, R.; Huebener, R. P. (1 April 1987). "Two-dimensional imaging of trapped magnetic flux quanta in Josephson tunnel junctions". Physical Review B. 35 (10). American Physical Society (APS): 5267–5269. Bibcode:1987PhRvB..35.5267M. doi:10.1103/physrevb.35.5267. ISSN 0163-1829. PMID 9940709.
- Braun, Wolfgang; Mannhart, Jochen (2019-08-14). "Film deposition by thermal laser evaporation". AIP Advances. 9 (8): 085310. Bibcode:2019AIPA....9h5310B. doi:10.1063/1.5111678. S2CID 202065503.
