= Nanomorphic cell =

The nanomorphic cell is a conception of an atomic-level, integrated, self-sustaining microsystem with five main functions: internal energy supply, sensing, actuation, computation and communication. Atomic level integration provides the ultimate functionality per unit volume for microsystems. The nanomorphic cell abstraction allows one to analyze the fundamental limits of attainable performance for nanoscale systems in much the same way that the Turing machine and the Carnot Engine support such limit studies for information processing and heat engines respectively.

The nanomorphic cell concept is inspired by the trend, synergistic with semiconductor device scaling; to use these core technologies for diverse integrated system applications. This trend is called Functional Diversification and is characterized by the integration of non-CMOS devices such as sensors, actuators, energy sources etc. with traditional CMOS and other novel information processing devices. The multifunctional microsystems becomes morphic (literally means in the shape of ) because its architecture are defined by the specific application and the fundamental limits on volumetric system parameters.

The nanomorphic cell model was applied to analyze the capabilities of an autonomous integrated microsystem on the order of the size of a living cell, i.e. a cube of 10 micrometer on a side [1, 2]. The function of this microsystem is, for example, upon injection into the body, to interact with living cells, e.g. determine the state of the cell and to support certain "therapeutic" action. It must have the capability to collect data on the living cell, analyze the data, and make a decision on the state of the living cell. It must also communicate with an external controlling agent, and possibly, take corrective action. Such a cell would need its own energy sources, sensors, computers, and communication devices, integrated into a complete system whose structure is dictated by the intended nanomorphic cell function. The Nanomorphic Cell can be considered as an extreme example of a class of systems known generically as Autonomous Microsystems, for example WIMS (Wireless Integrated Microsystems), PicoNode, Lab-on-a-Pill and Smartdust.
