= Klaus Kern =

German scientist (born 1960)

- Born: 24 March 1960 (age 66); Deesen, Germany
- Awards: Gottfried Wilhelm Leibniz Prize, van't Hoff Prize
- Scientific career
- Fields: Physical Chemistry
- Workplaces: Max Planck Institute for Solid State Research and EPFL
- Doctoral students: Magalí Lingenfelder

Klaus Kern (born 24 March 1960) is a German physical chemist. Kern received the Gottfried Wilhelm Leibniz Prize of the Deutsche Forschungsgemeinschaft in 2008.

== Biography ==
Kern studied at the University of Bonn chemistry and physics, and received his Ph.D. in 1986.

== Research ==
He worked first at the Jülich Research Centre (1986-1991) and at Bell Labs as visiting research fellow in 1988. He then became professor at the École Polytechnique Fédérale de Lausanne in 1991. Since 1998, he is one of the directors of the Max Planck Institute for Solid State Research in Stuttgart.

Through his research and publications, Kern has pioneered the bottom-up fabrication and characterization of nanostructures all the way down to molecular and atomic length scales. He and his group have developed novel methods to control atomic and molecular interactions at surfaces which have provided the unique ability to engineer atomic and molecular architectures of well-defined size, shape, composition and functionality. With Manish Garg, Kern developed a microscope for observing extremely fast processes at the quantum scale; allowing for electron tracking at the scale of individual atoms.

As of 2024, his h-index is 132 according to Google Scholar.

== Awards ==
In 2008, he received the Gottfried Wilhelm Leibniz Prize of the Deutsche Forschungsgemeinschaft, which is the highest honour awarded in German research.
