= Francoise LeGoues =

American materials scientist and technology executive

- Education: Carnegie Mellon University (Ph.D.)
- Occupations: Materials scientist Technology executive (former VP of Innovation at IBM); VP of Transformation at YAI: Seeing Beyond Disability

Francoise K. LeGoues (also published as F. K. Le Goues) is an American materials scientist and technology executive who worked for IBM at the Thomas J. Watson Research Center.

Legoues joined IBM in the mid-1980s, after earning a Ph.D. at Carnegie Mellon University with the 1983 dissertation Critical tests and applications of the theories of solid-solid homogeneous nucleation for F.C.C.–F.C.C. phase transformations. As a materials scientist, she worked on the growth and strain relaxation of semiconductor crystals, thin films, and quantum wires. She was the 1985 recipient of the Robert Lansing Hardy Award of the American Institute of Mining, Metallurgical, and Petroleum Engineers, and was named as a Fellow of the American Physical Society (APS) in 1998, after a nomination from the APS Division of Materials, "for insightful contributions and creative use of electron microscopy in determining mechanisms of strain relaxation in heteroepitaxial growth of semiconductor thin films".

Later, as a technology executive, she fostered innovation by founding an internal crowdfunding program at IBM, and headed a program to change employee meetings from being held in-person to on-line, in the Second Life virtual world. She became vice president of innovation at IBM before leaving IBM to become the vice president of transformation for the YAI National Institute for People with Disabilities, a non-profit organization.

== Selected publications ==
- Dimos, D.; Chaudhari, P.; Mannhart, J.; LeGoues, F. K. (July 1988), "Orientation dependence of grain-boundary critical currents in YBa_{2}Cu_{3}O_{7−δ} bicrystals", Physical Review Letters, 61 (2): 219–222, doi:10.1103/physrevlett.61.219, PMID 10039063
- LeGoues, F. K.; Rosenberg, R.; Nguyen, T.; Himpsel, F.; Meyerson, B. S. (February 1989), "Oxidation studies of SiGe", Journal of Applied Physics, 65 (4): 1724–1728, Bibcode:1989JAP....65.1724L, doi:10.1063/1.342945
- LeGoues, F. K.; Meyerson, B. S.; Morar, J. F. (June 1991), "Anomalous strain relaxation in SiGe thin films and superlattices", Physical Review Letters, 66 (22): 2903–2906, Bibcode:1991PhRvL..66.2903L, doi:10.1103/physrevlett.66.2903, PMID 10043649
- Tersoff, J.; LeGoues, F. K. (May 1994), "Competing relaxation mechanisms in strained layers", Physical Review Letters, 72 (22): 3570–3573, Bibcode:1994PhRvL..72.3570T, doi:10.1103/physrevlett.72.3570, PMID 10056233
