= Ali Alavi =

British theoretical chemist

Ali Alavi FRS
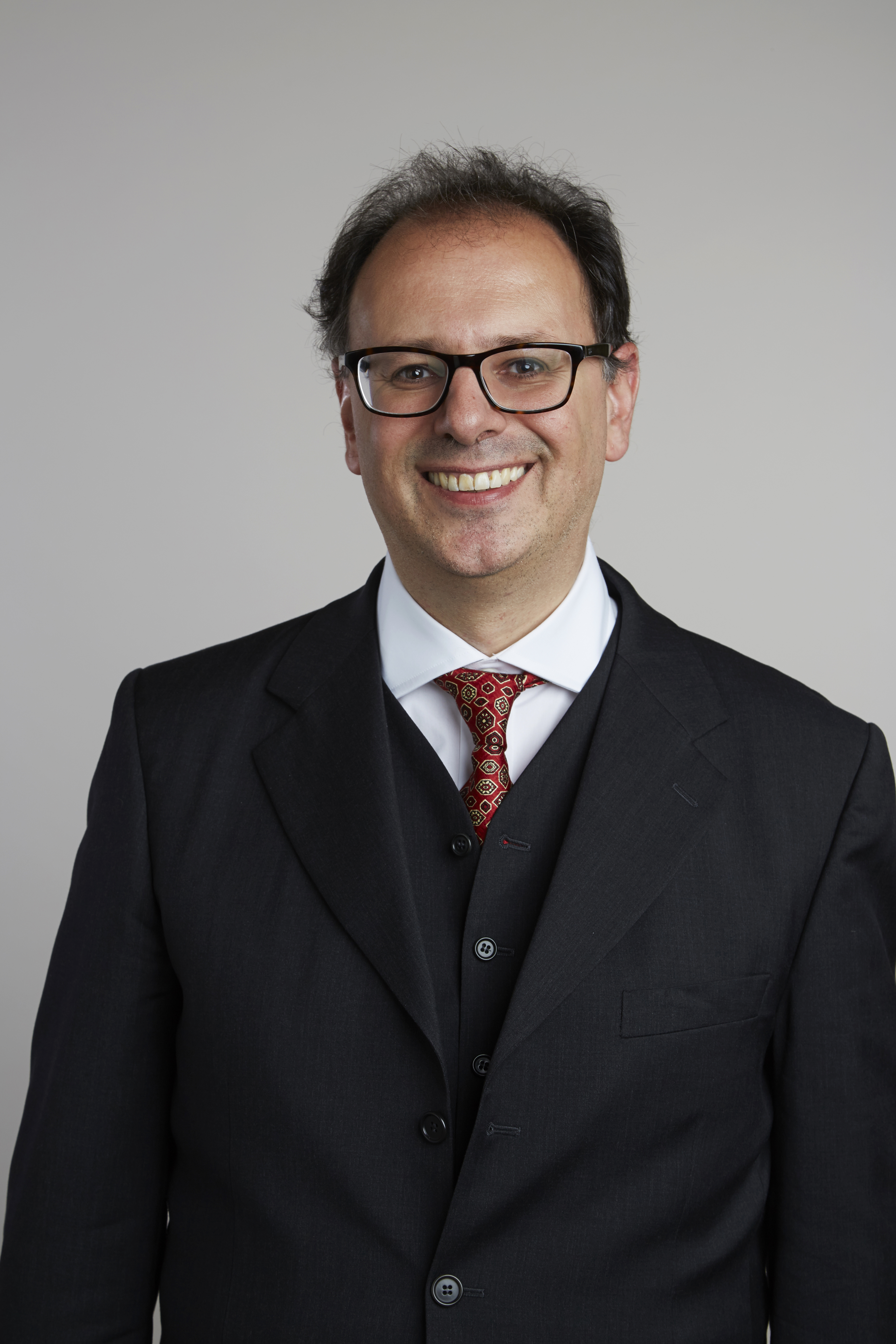
- Ali Alavi at the Royal Society admissions day in London, July 2015
- Born: 10 May 1966 (age 60); Tehran, Iran
- Known for: Quantum Monte Carlo methods
- Awards: FRS (2015); FRSC (2015)
- Scientific career
- Fields: Chemistry
- Workplaces: University of Cambridge; Queen's University Belfast; Max Planck Institute for Solid State Research
- Thesis: Molecular-dynamics studies of thin films and charge-transfer (1990)
- Website: fkf.mpg.de/alavi; www-alavi.ch.cam.ac.uk; www.ch.cam.ac.uk/person/asa10

Ali Alavi FRS (born 10 May 1966) is a professor of theoretical chemistry in the Department of Chemistry at the University of Cambridge and a Director of the Max Planck Institute for Solid State Research in Stuttgart.

== Education ==
Alavi was born in Tehran and was educated at the University of Cambridge where he was awarded a Bachelor of Arts degree in Natural Sciences followed by a PhD in 1990 for research on the molecular dynamics of thin films and charge-transfer complexes.

== Research and career ==
His research is focused on the electron correlation and the Schrödinger equations, combining quantum chemistry with Monte Carlo methods, which enable solutions to problems which are very difficult to solve using standard Ab initio quantum chemistry methods alone. His research has been funded by the Engineering and Physical Sciences Research Council (EPSRC). Before working in Cambridge and Stuttgart, he held an academic post at Queen's University Belfast.

== Awards and honours ==
Alavi was elected a Fellow of the Royal Society (FRS) in 2015. His certificate of election reads:

Ali Alavi is distinguished for his highly original contributions to the computation of electron correlation effects in atoms and molecules. His idea of using Monte Carlo sampling of Slater determinants constitutes a breakthrough as it circumvents the Fermion sign problem. He developed efficient algorithms (FCIQMC) for this, which enables the accurate treatment of larger systems than could be handled by any earlier method. He has applied the technique to outstanding quantum chemical problems. He has also contributed to the study of reaction mechanisms on surfaces and developed a finite-temperature density-functional method which proved particularly useful for metals and metallic surfaces.

Alavi was also elected a scientific member of the Max Planck Society in 2013 and a Fellow of the Royal Society of Chemistry (FRSC) in 2015.
