= Micro power source =

Small-scale power generation technology

Micro power sources and nano power sources are units of RFID, MEMS, microsystems and nanosystems for energy-power generation, harvesting from ambient, storage and conversion.
