= Joachim Maier =

German materials scientist (born 1955)

- Born: 5 May 1955 (age 71); Neunkirchen (Saar), Germany
- Education: Saarland University
- Scientific career
- Fields: Solid state chemistry
- Workplaces: University of Tübingen; Max Planck Institute for Solid State Research

Joachim Maier (born 5 May 1955) is Emeritus Director at the Max Planck Institute for Solid State Research in Stuttgart (Germany) and Scientific Member of the Max Planck Society.

== Education and career ==
Maier studied chemistry at Saarland University in Saarbrücken, made his Masters and PhD in Physical Chemistry there. He received his habilitation at the University of Tübingen. From 1988 to 1991 he was responsible for the activities on functional ceramics at the MPI for Metals Research in Stuttgart, and from 1988 to 1996 he taught defect chemistry at the Massachusetts Institute of Technology. Notwithstanding other prestigious offers, he decided in favor of the Max Planck Society. In 1991 he was appointed Scientific Member of the Max Planck Society, Director at the MPI for Solid State Research and Honorary Professor at the University of Stuttgart. He is the recipient of various prizes and a member of various national and international academies including German Academy of Sciences Leopoldina, German Technical Academy Acatech, Academia Europaea, Academy of Science and Literature (Mainz, Germany), Fellow of the Royal Society of Chemistry, Fellow of the Electrochemical Society, IUPAC Fellow. Joachim Maier is Editor-in-Chief of Solid State Ionics and on the board of a number of scientific journals.

== Research ==
Maier's major research fields comprise physical chemistry of the solid state, thermodynamics and kinetics, defect chemistry and transport in solids, ionic and mixed conductors, boundary regions and electrochemistry. In this context energy transfer and storage are to the fore. Maier developed a scientific field nowadays termed nanoionics. Nanoionics refers to questions of ion transport, stoichiometry and reactivity in confined systems and is of equal significance for chemistry, physics and biology. In these fields Maier has authored/coauthored more than 800 publications in peer-reviewed journals.
