= YAI: Seeing Beyond Disability =

American non-profit organization

YAI
- Founded: February 1957
- Founder: Bert MacLeech and Pearl Maze
- Legal status: 501(c)(3) nonprofit organization
- Headquarters: New York City, New York, U.S.
- Region served: United States
- CEO: Gary Milchman
- Staff: 4000
- Website: www.yai.org

YAI, previously known as the Young Adult Institute, is an organization serving people with intellectual and developmental disabilities (IDD) in the United States. YAI launched as a pilot program at a small school in Brooklyn, New York, in February 1957. The pilot program was run by co-founders Bert MacLeech and Pearl Maze and served seven people with I/DD. Today, YAI has expanded to a team of over 4,000 employees and supports over 20,000 people in the I/DD community. YAI supports people with autism, Down syndrome, and cerebral palsy, among others.

They provide more than 300 programs and services for children and adults in New York, New Jersey, and California.

From 2019, YAI has maintained the Platinum Seal of Transparency from GuideStar, the world's largest organization that evaluates the effectiveness and mission of US-based nonprofit organizations.

== Affiliates ==
Beyond YAI's range of programs, through four affiliate agencies, YAI's network is able to provide additional services.

=== Premier HealthCare ===
Premier HealthCare provides medical, dental, and psychiatric services to everyone and specializes in supporting people with intellectual and developmental disabilities (I/DD). Premier's clinics offer people with I/DD access to high-quality primary care and specialty outpatient services with doctors and other professionals trained in their unique needs.

=== Manhattan Star Academy (MSA) ===
MSA, a school on Manhattan's West Side for young people aged 5 to 21, believes that every child has the capacity to learn, grow, and contribute. Students who have a broad range of needs and learning styles receive encouragement, support, skills, and opportunities to develop academically and socially from teachers and therapists. MSA's pre-school, lower school, and upper school all foster a collaborative, multidisciplinary learning environment that promotes independence and inclusivity. MSA's mission is to provide a comprehensive, developmentally appropriate program that focuses on the whole student. Instructional activities are designed for each student to maximize their full potential and be as independent as possible.

=== International Academy of Hope (iHOPE) ===
iHOPE serves children, adolescents, and young adults from ages 5 years to 21 years old, with sustained acquired brain injuries or other brain-based disorders who cannot be served in their local school systems. To allow all of iHOPE's services to be available under one roof, the school will relocate in January 2022 from East Harlem to Midtown Manhattan.

=== The National Institute for People with Disabilities of New Jersey (NIPD/NJ) ===
With an emphasis on providing opportunities for individuals to live as independently as possible, NIPD/NJ offers supervised and supportive residential programs in five northern New Jersey counties where residents strive to achieve personal and professional goals, contribute to supportive communities, and prepare for volunteer work and possible employment.

== History ==
1957 - The first YAI center opened at the Rugby school in Brooklyn and support 7 people.

1960 - YAI introduced its trailblazing sexuality education program.

1968 - The organization was recognized by the Mayor's committee as a model for rehabilitative services throughout the city.

1971 - YAI opened its first community residence in Astoria.

1981 - YAI hosted its first International Conference at UN headquarters; 2,000 people from 30 countries attended.

2009 - YAI won a major legal victory that affirmed the right of people with disabilities to live in dignity and stay in their communities.

2016 - YAI selected to implement mental health crisis prevention through NY START.

2017 - To better implement its person-centered philosophy, YAI transitioned to a regional operational model.

2018 - YAI recognized as New York's 25th largest nonprofit organization.

== Services ==
=== Employment services ===
Employment services provide job skills training, resume writing, interview preparation, application help, intensive job coaching, and follow along support to people with I/DD who wish to obtain and maintain competitive employment.

=== Education ===
Manhattan Star Academy - Manhattan Star Academy is a school for 5- to 12-year-olds, driven by the belief that every child has the capacity to learn, grow, and contribute.

iHOPE - The International Academy of Hope serves children, adolescents, and young adults from ages 5 to 21 years, who have sustained acquired brain injuries or other brain-based disorders and who cannot be served in their local school systems.

=== Clinical services ===
Premier HealthCare offers primary care and specialty outpatient services to patients who have intellectual and developmental disabilities. At their four New York City locations, they offer outpatient healthcare services that include primary care, dentistry, pediatrics, psychiatry, podiatry, neurology, and ophthalmology.

=== Family services ===
Family services include respite, crisis intervention, recreation, and socialization services for families of children and adults with disabilities living at home.

=== Community habilitation ===
Specialists provide individualized skills training in the home and the community. Services focus on a person's strengths and critical skills for development, including building skills and independence in the areas of self-care, social skills, money management, safety, household tasks, participating in local activities, and job success.

=== Day services ===
The emphasis of day habilitation is participation in the larger community. YAI's services include tutoring to help improve basic academic skills and volunteering, among other activities. Participants have daily opportunities to develop skills, including safe travel using public transportation and community integration.

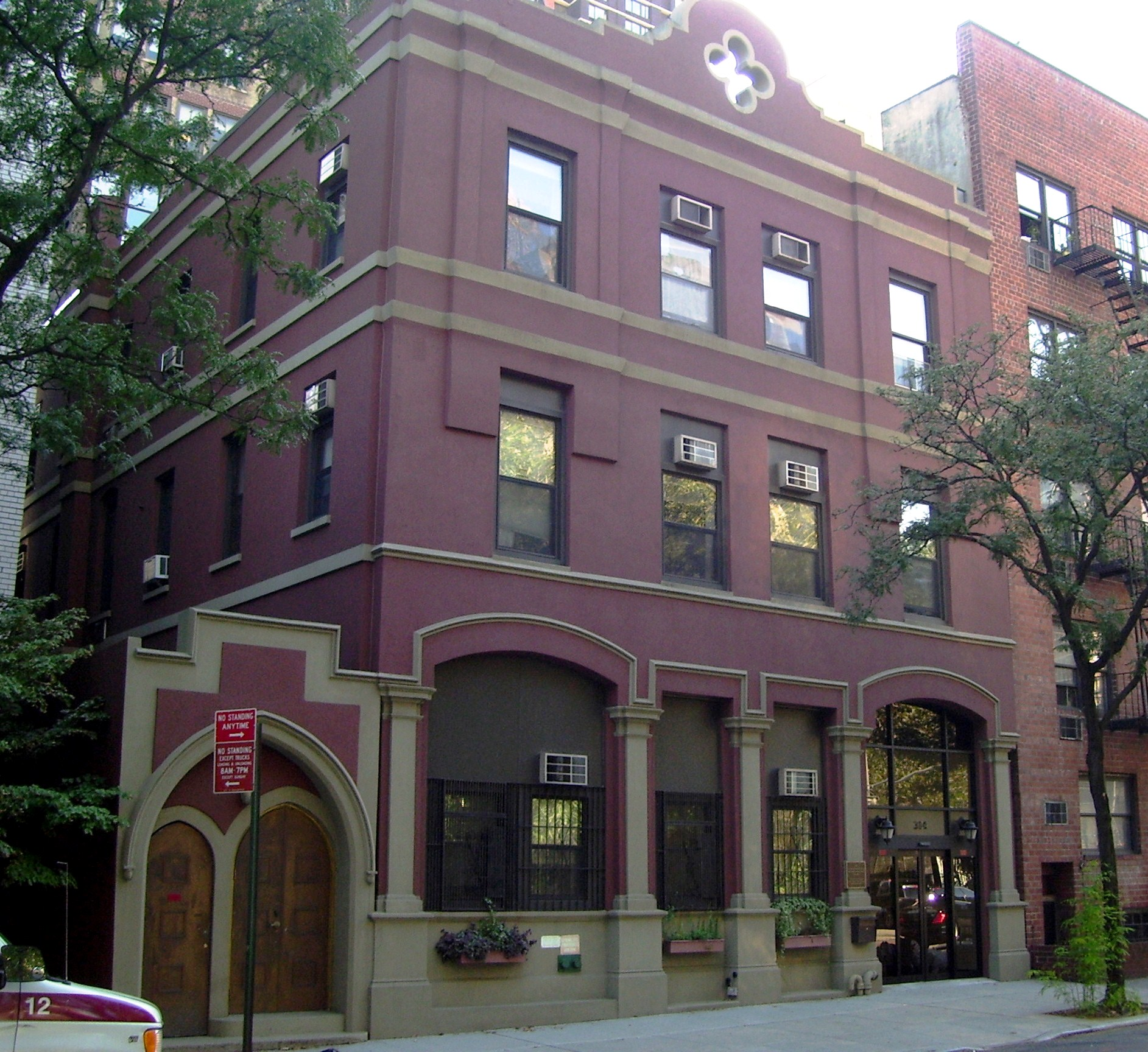
YAI Individualized Residential Alternative located at 314 East 35th Street in Manhattan

=== Residential services ===
Residential services are offered to people in need of group homes and supportive apartments. YAI's individualized residential alternatives (IRAs) provide varying levels of staff support and supervision. Supervised IRAs offer 24-hour staff presence and supportive IRAs offer need-based supports and services to people who are able to live more independently.

=== Information and referral services ===
LINK, YAI's information and referral service, provides the latest information on programs that make a difference in the lives of people with intellectual and developmental disabilities and their families.

=== Social life, recreation, camping, and travel ===
YAI offers social opportunities and events across all age ranges and locations. Travel opportunities for adults with I/DD include weekend trips and extended vacations with domestic and international destinations. YAI also offers an award-winning inclusive camping experience in the Catskills called 'YAI: Mainstreaming at Camp' to children and teens with developmental and learning disabilities, ages 8 and up.

== COVID-19 pandemic ==
Since most of their programs are based in the greater New York area, YAI have been impacted particularly hard by the COVID-19 pandemic. Unfortunately, due to COVID-19, YAI lost residents, which has had a significant impact on the staff and the people YAI supports. The organization is committed to ensuring that the people they support are protected and cared for and put up several COVID-19 protocols in place. At YAI's Woodside residence, the staff separated all four floors, and each resident is quarantined to their own floor. Each floor has individual food, a separate kitchen, and personal equipment like iPads. Vista Court IRA has checklists that are provided to everyone on how to clean surfaces, doorknobs and anything that should be sanitized more frequently.

Premier HealthCare, YAI's affiliate clinic, started offering rapid point-of-care COVID Antigen testing and vaccines at all the NYC clinics in the Bronx, Brooklyn, Manhattan, and Queens.
