= Peter Wyder =

Swiss physicist (1934–2024)

Peter Rudolf Wyder (26 February 1934 – 30 July 2024) was a Swiss physicist and a professor of experimental solid-state physics at the Radboud University Nijmegen in the Netherlands from 1967 until 1988 and in 1990. Wyder later served as director of the Laboratoire National des Champs Magnétiques Intenses (High Magnetic Field Laboratory) in Grenoble, France.

== Life and career ==
Wyder was born in Burgdorf on 26 February 1934. He obtained his PhD at ETH Zurich in 1965 with a doctoral thesis titled: "Freie Weglängen für die elektrische und die thermische Leitfähigkeit" and thesis advisor Jorgen Lykke Olsen.

He then did research in the US as a Fellow of the Miller Institute of Basic Research in Science at the University of California, Berkeley (1965) and as a Research fellow at Harvard University (1966). Starting in 1967 Wyder was a professor of experimental solid-state physics at Radboud University Nijmegen. There he worked with the High Magnetic Field Laboratory.

Wyder was director of the Laboratoire National des Champs Magnétiques Intenses (Grenoble High Magnetic Field Laboratory, GHMFL) in Grenoble, France. The laboratory was founded on the basis of cooperation between the Max Planck Institute for Solid State Research and the French National Centre for Scientific Research. Wyder was director of the Max Planck Institute for Solid State Research between 1984 and 2001. He became Honorary Professor at the University of Konstanz (1987) and Nijmegen University (1989). Wyder retired as director of the GHMFL in 2001.

Wyder died in Amsterdam on 30 July 2024, at the age of 90.

== Honours ==
Wyder was elected a foreign member of the Royal Netherlands Academy of Arts and Sciences in 1985.

== PhD students ==
Wyder's PhD students include:

| PhD student | Thesis | University | Year |
|---|---|---|---|
| Hendriks, Jan | Measurements on superconducting films | Radboud University Nijmegen (Katholieke Universiteit Nijmegen) | 1976 |
| Koning, Jan-Jaap (Jan Jacob) | A far Infrared Fabry-Pérot Interferometer for Multiple Reflection Spectroscopy on Heavy Fermion Metals in High Magnetic Fields | University of Konstanz (Universität Konstanz) | 1995 |
| Maan, Jan Kees | Submillimetre wave spectroscopy of semiconductors in high magnetic fields | Radboud University Nijmegen | 1979 |
| Rasing, Theo H. M. | Experimental investigation of 4-dimensional superspace crystals: A study of modulated Rb2ZnBr4 | Radboud University Nijmegen | 1982 |
| Sparenberg, Anja | Light Propagation in Magnetic Fields | University of Konstanz | 2001 |
| van der Heijden, Rob W. | Far-infrared laser investigations of the high-frequency conductivity of metals under quantum conditions: Semimetals in high magnetic fields and point contacts | Radboud University Nijmegen | 1982 |
| van Vlimmeren, Quirinus A. G. | Elementary magnetic excitations in ising-like systems: A study of the excitations in the microwave and far infrared region in RbFeCl3.2H2O | Eindhoven University of Technology (Technische Universiteit Eindhoven) | 1979 |

== Publications ==
=== by Wyder ===
include:

- 1964: Wyder, Peter (January 1964). "Mean Free Paths in the Normal and the Superconducting State". Reviews of Modern Physics. 36 (1): 116–117. Bibcode:1964RvMP...36..116W. doi:10.1103/RevModPhys.36.116.
- 1965: Freie Weglängen für die elektrische und die thermische Leitfähigkeit, doctoral dissertation, ETH Zürich, 1965. Thesis advisor: Olsen, J.L. Also published as Wyder, Peter (April 1965). "Freie Weglängen für die elektrische und die thermische Leitfähigkeit". Zeitschrift für Physik B. 3 (4): 263–291. Bibcode:1965PKM.....3..263W. doi:10.1007/BF02422773. hdl:20.500.11850/132406.
- 1981 with J. A. A. J. Perenboom and F. Meier: Electronic properties of small metallic particles, Amsterdam: North-Holland Pub. Co., 1981. Series: Physics reports, v. 78, no. 2.
- 1994: Proceedings of the International Conference on Materials and Mechanisms of Superconductivity - High Temperature Superconductors IV : Grenoble, France, 5–9 July 1994. Pt. 1/2/3/4/5, Amsterdam North-Holland 1994. Series: Physica C, Superconductivity.
- 2002 with Robert Kratz: Principles of pulsed magnet design, Berlin; New York: Springer, 2002
- 2003 with Israel D. Vagner: Recent trends in theory of physical phenomena in high magnetic fields, Dordrecht: Kluwer Academic Publishers, 2003. Series: NATO science series, Series II, Mathematics, physics and chemistry, vol. 106. Proceedings of the NATO Advanced Research Workshop, Les Houches, France, 25 February – 1 March 2002.
- 2004, with Israel D. Vagner and Boris I. Lembrikov: Electrodynamics of magnetoactive media, Berlin: Springer, 2004. Series: Springer series in solid-state sciences, 135.
- 2005, with G. Franco Bassani and Gerald Liedl: Encyclopedia of Condensed Matter Physics, Academic Press San Diego: Elsevier Science & Technology Books. Aug. 2005.
- 2013, with Klaus Andres and Bruno Lüthi: Ein Pionier der Nanotechnologie : Nobelpreisträgers Heinrich Rohrer, Neue Zürcher Zeitung, Nr. 114, (21 May 2013), S. 12.

=== for Wyder ===
- 1995, Walter Joss: Physics and magnetic fields: a festschrift to honour professor Peter Wyder on the occasion of his 60th birthday, Amsterdam : North-Holland, 1995. Series: Physica B, vol. 204, no. 1-4 (1995)
