= Bettina Lotsch =

German chemist (born 1977)

Bettina Valeska Lotsch
- Born: 7 September 1977 (age 49)
- Education: LMU Munich
- Awards: Gottfried Wilhelm Leibniz Prize (2025); EU-40 Materials Prize (2017); Fellow of the Royal Society of Chemistry (FRSC, 2014)
- Scientific career
- Workplaces: LMU Munich; University of Toronto; Max Planck Institute for Solid State Research
- Thesis: From Molecular Building Blocks to Condensed Carbon Nitride Networks: Structure and Reactivity
- Doctoral advisor: Wolfgang Schnick

Bettina Valeska Lotsch (born 7 September 1977 in Frankenthal (Pfalz)) is a German chemist. She is Director at the Max Planck Institute for Solid State Research in Stuttgart, Germany.

== Life ==
Lotsch studied chemistry at LMU Munich and graduated in 2000. In 2006, she completed her dissertation in the group of Wolfgang Schnick at LMU. From 2007 to 2008, she worked as a postdoctoral researcher in the group of G. A. Ozin at the University of Toronto. From 2009 to the beginning of 2017, she was an assistant professor at LMU, as well as an independent group leader for the Max Planck Institute for Solid State Research. In 2017, she became Director of the Max Planck Institute for Solid State Research and an honorary professor at LMU.

== Research ==
Her research focuses on rational materials synthesis at the interface of solid-state chemistry, materials chemistry, and nanochemistry. Materials of her research interest are:

- New materials for energy conversion and storage (e.g., porous frameworks, lithium solid electrolytes for all-solid-state batteries)
- Photonic nanostructures for optical sensing
- 2D nanosheet materials and artificial heterostructures

== Selected publications ==
- Lau, Vincent Wing-hei; Klose, Daniel; Kasap, Hatice; Podjaski, Filip; Pignié, Marie-Claire; Reisner, Erwin; Jeschke, Gunnar; Lotsch, Bettina V. (2017). "Dark Photocatalysis: Storage of Solar Energy in Carbon Nitride for Time-Delayed Hydrogen Generation". Angewandte Chemie International Edition. 56 (2): 510–514. doi:10.1002/anie.201608553. ISSN 1521-3773. PMC 6680103. PMID 27930846.
- Lotsch, Bettina V.; Blum, Volker; Senker, Jürgen; Duppel, Viola; Mesch, Maria B.; Weinberger, Simon; Botari, Tiago; Moudrakovski, Igor; Lau, Vincent Wing-hei (8 July 2016). "Rational design of carbon nitride photocatalysts by identification of cyanamide defects as catalytically relevant sites". Nature Communications. 7 12165. Bibcode:2016NatCo...712165L. doi:10.1038/ncomms12165. ISSN 2041-1723. PMC 4941108. PMID 27387536.
- Ast, Christian R.; Lotsch, Bettina V.; Parkin, Stuart S. P.; Duppel, Viola; Dmitry Marchenko; Varykhalov, Andrei; Topp, Andreas; Straßer, Carola; Ali, Mazhar N. (31 May 2016). "Dirac cone protected by non-symmorphic symmetry and three-dimensional Dirac line node in ZrSiS". Nature Communications. 7 11696. arXiv:1509.00861. Bibcode:2016NatCo...711696S. doi:10.1038/ncomms11696. ISSN 2041-1723. PMC 4895020. PMID 27241624.
- Lotsch, Bettina V.; Ochsenfeld, Christian; Podjaski, Filip; Savasci, Gökcen; Stegbauer, Linus; Haase, Frederik; Vyas, Vijay S. (30 September 2015). "A tunable azine covalent organic framework platform for visible light-induced hydrogen generation". Nature Communications. 6: 8508. Bibcode:2015NatCo...6.8508V. doi:10.1038/ncomms9508. ISSN 2041-1723. PMC 4598847. PMID 26419805.
- Szendrei, Katalin; Ganter, Pirmin; Sànchez-Sobrado, Olalla; Eger, Roland; Kuhn, Alexander; Lotsch, Bettina V. (2015). "Touchless Optical Finger Motion Tracking Based on 2D Nanosheets with Giant Moisture Responsiveness". Advanced Materials. 27 (41): 6341–6348. Bibcode:2015AdM....27.6341S. doi:10.1002/adma.201503463. ISSN 1521-4095. PMID 26394013. S2CID 5916526.
- Lotsch, B. V.; Senker, J.; Mesch, M. B.; Hug, S.; Schwinghammer, K. (28 October 2015). "Phenyl-triazine oligomers for light-driven hydrogen evolution". Energy & Environmental Science. 8 (11): 3345–3353. Bibcode:2015EnEnS...8.3345S. doi:10.1039/C5EE02574E. ISSN 1754-5706.
- Lau, Vincent Wing-hei; Mesch, Maria B.; Duppel, Viola; Blum, Volker; Senker, Jürgen; Lotsch, Bettina V. (28 January 2015). "Low-Molecular-Weight Carbon Nitrides for Solar Hydrogen Evolution" (PDF). Journal of the American Chemical Society. 137 (3): 1064–1072. Bibcode:2015JAChS.137.1064L. doi:10.1021/ja511802c. ISSN 0002-7863. PMID 25537611.
- Schwinghammer, Katharina; Mesch, Maria B.; Duppel, Viola; Ziegler, Christian; Senker, Jürgen; Lotsch, Bettina V. (5 February 2014). "Crystalline Carbon Nitride Nanosheets for Improved Visible-Light Hydrogen Evolution". Journal of the American Chemical Society. 136 (5): 1730–1733. Bibcode:2014JAChS.136.1730S. doi:10.1021/ja411321s. ISSN 0002-7863. PMID 24432762.
- Lotsch, Bettina V.; Schwinghammer, Katharina; Stegbauer, Linus (3 June 2014). "A hydrazone-based covalent organic framework for photocatalytic hydrogen production". Chemical Science. 5 (7): 2789–2793. arXiv:1401.3656. Bibcode:2014arXiv1401.3656S. doi:10.1039/C4SC00016A. ISSN 2041-6539. S2CID 37487748.
- Schwinghammer, Katharina; Tuffy, Brian; Mesch, Maria B.; Wirnhier, Eva; Martineau, Charlotte; Taulelle, Francis; Schnick, Wolfgang; Senker, Jürgen; Lotsch, Bettina V. (2013). "Triazine-based Carbon Nitrides for Visible-Light-Driven Hydrogen Evolution". Angewandte Chemie International Edition. 52 (9): 2435–2439. doi:10.1002/anie.201206817. ISSN 1521-3773. PMID 23341324.

== Awards ==
- Gottfried Wilhelm Leibniz Prize, 2025
- EU-40 Materials Prize, European Materials Research Society (EMRS), 2017
- Young Elite – the Top 40 under 40 in Economy, Politics, and Society, 2015 and 2016
- ERC Starting Grant, 2014
- Elected Fellow of the Royal Society of Chemistry (FRSC), 2014
- Fast Track Scholarship, Robert Bosch Foundation, 2008–2010
- E.ON Culture Prize, 2007
- Feodor Lynen Postdoc Scholarship (Alexander von Humboldt-Foundation), 2007
- Dissertation award (Stiftungspreis), LMU Munich, 2007
- PhD scholarship, German National Academic Foundation, 2004
- PhD scholarship, Fonds der Chemischen Industrie (FCI), 2003
- Faculty Prize (best diploma), 2002
- Herbert-Marcinek Prize (best preliminary diploma), 2000
- Scholarship, German National Academic Foundation, 1997
- Scholarship of the Stiftung Maximilianeum, 1997
