= Max Le Blanc =

German chemist (1865 – 1943)

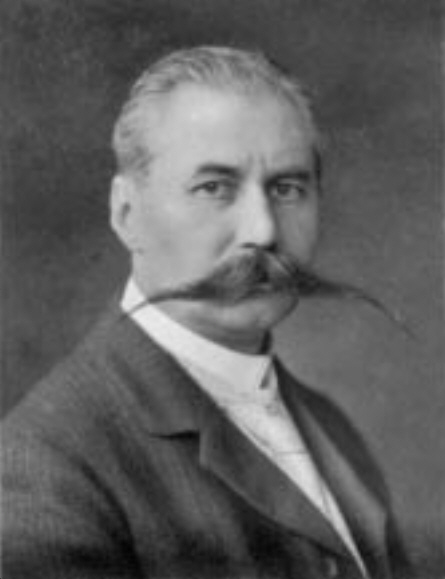

Max Julius Louis Le Blanc (1865 – 1943) was a German physical chemist who worked in the field of electrochemistry, writing an influential textbook in 1895 on the subject which went through several editions. He was a professor at the Technical University of Karlsruhe, later at the Wilhelm Ostwald Institute at Leipzig. He is best known for inventing the hydrogen electrode used for pH measurements. In 1933 he was a signatory to the Vow of allegiance of the Professors of the German Universities and High-Schools to Adolf Hitler and the National Socialistic State.

== Life and work ==
Le Blanc was born on 26 May 1865 in Barten, Kingdom of Prussia to builder Louis and his wife Marie Kickton and after studying at the Gymnasium in Rastenburg, he went to the universities at Tübingen and Berlin. His doctoral work of 1888 was on organic chemistry under August Wilhelm von Hofmann. He however moved to physical chemistry and worked under Wilhelm Ostwald at Leipzig from 1891. He worked in electrochemistry at Hoechst AG from 1896 to 1901 and subsequently taught physical chemistry at the technical institute, Karlsruhe. He returned to Leipzig succeeding Wilhelm Ostwald in 1906. Le Blanc's work was chiefly on electrolytes and an understanding of voltages and decomposition potentials. He also discovered that a layer of hydrogen around a platinum electrode makes it effectively a hydrogen electrode. In 1893 he showed that hydrogen bubbled around a platinum electrode made it usable as a hydrogen electrode. This made rapid and standardized pH measurements possible. His work in industry included methods for regenerating chromic acid in dye and rubber manufacture during World War I.

Le Blanc died 31 July 1945.
