= Claire Le Goues =

American computer scientist

Claire Le Goues (/lə gwɛs/) is an American computer scientist, and a professor in the Carnegie Mellon University Software and Societal Systems Department. Her research involves software engineering, programming languages, automatic bug fixing and self-healing code, and the use of large language models in computer programming.

== Education and career ==
Le Goues majored in computer science at Harvard University, where she studied type theory under the mentorship of Greg Morrisett. After graduating in 2006, and working for a year as a software engineer for IBM, she continued her studies at the University of Virginia, advised by Westley Weimer. She received a master's degree there in 2009, and completed her Ph.D. in 2013; her doctoral dissertation was Automatic Program Repair Using Genetic Programming.

She joined Carnegie Mellon University as an assistant professor in the Software and Societal Systems Department in 2013. She was promoted to untenured associate professor in 2019, given tenure in 2021, and promoted again to full professor in 2024.

== Recognition ==
Le Goues was a 2025 recipient of the Presidential Early Career Award for Scientists and Engineers.
