= Microsystem =

A microsystem is a self-contained subsystem located within a larger system. It generally constitutes the smallest unit of analysis in systems theory.

== Ecological systems theory ==
Urie Bronfenbrenner uses the term in his ecological systems theory where it constitutes the most immediate environment which envelops an individual. Thus in a child's development it consists of parents, guardians, other family members, and close friends who constitute the immediate home circle.
