= Proton conductor =

Type of electrolyte

A proton conductor in a static electric field

A proton conductor is an electrolyte, typically a solid electrolyte, in which H^{+} are the primary charge carriers.

== Composition ==
Acid solutions exhibit proton-conductivity, while pure proton conductors are usually dry solids. Typical materials are polymers or ceramic. Typically, the pores in practical materials are small such that protons dominate direct current and transport of cations or bulk solvent is prevented. Water ice is a common example of a pure proton conductor, albeit a relatively poor one. A special form of water ice, superionic water, has been shown to conduct much more efficiently than normal water ice.

Solid-phase proton conduction was first suggested by Alfred Rene Jean Paul Ubbelohde and S. E. Rogers. in 1950, although electrolyte proton currents have been recognized since 1806.

Proton conduction has also been observed in the new type of proton conductors for fuel cells – protic organic ionic plastic crystals (POIPCs), such as 1,2,4-triazolium perfluorobutanesulfonate and imidazolium methanesulfonate. In particular, a high ionic conductivity of 10 mS/cm is reached at 185 °C in the plastic phase of imidazolium methanesulfonate.

When in the form of thin membranes, proton conductors are an essential part of small, inexpensive fuel cells. The polymer nafion is a typical proton conductor in fuel cells. A jelly-like substance similar to Nafion residing in the ampullae of Lorenzini of sharks has proton conductivity only slightly lower than nafion.

High proton conductivity has been reported among alkaline-earth cerates and zirconate based perovskite materials such as acceptor doped SrCeO_{3}, BaCeO_{3} and BaZrO_{3}. Relatively high proton conductivity has also been found in rare-earth ortho-niobates and ortho-tantalates as well as rare-earth tungstates.
