= Deep-sub-voltage nanoelectronics =

Deep-sub-voltage nanoelectronics are integrated circuits (ICs) operating near theoretical limits of energy consumption per unit of processing. These devices are intended to address the needs of applications such as wireless sensor networks which have dramatically different requirements from traditional electronics. For example, for microprocessors where performance is a primary metric of interest, but for some new devices, energy per instruction has become a more sensible metric.

The important case of fundamental ultimate limit for logic operation is the reversible computing.

The tiny autonomous devices (for example smartdust or autonomous Microelectromechanical systems) are based on deep-sub-voltage nanoelectronics.
