= Max Planck Institute for Solid State Research =

Research institute in Stuttgart, Germany

Coordinates: 48°44′48″N 9°4′51″E

- Abbreviation: MPI-FKF
- Formation: 1969; 57 years ago
- Type: Scientific institute
- Purpose: Research in the physics and chemistry of condensed matter
- Headquarters: Stuttgart, Germany
- Managing Director: Professor Bernhard Keimer
- Parent organization: Max Planck Society
- Website: (in English) (in German)

The Max Planck Institute for Solid State Research (German: Max-Planck-Institut für Festkörperforschung) was founded in 1969 and is one of the 84 institutes of the Max Planck Society. It is located on a campus in Stuttgart, together with the Max Planck Institute for Intelligent Systems.

== Research focus ==
Research at the Max Planck Institute for Solid State Research is focused on the physics and chemistry of condensed matter, including especially complex materials and nanoscale science. In both of these fields, electronic and ionic transport phenomena are of particular interest.

== Organization ==
The institute currently has eight departments.

=== Electronic Structure Theory ===
Led by Ali Alavi, the Department of Electronic Structure Theory is concerned with the development of ab initio methods for treating correlated electronic systems, using Quantum Monte Carlo, quantum chemical and many-body methodologies. Ab initio methods (including density functional theory) will be applied to problems of interest in heterogeneous catalysis, surface chemistry, electrochemistry, and photochemistry.

=== Solid State Spectroscopy ===
The Department of Solid State Spectroscopy is headed by Bernhard Keimer. Collective quantum phenomena in highly correlated electronic materials are studied by spectroscopic and scattering techniques. Topics of particular current interest include the interplay between charge, orbital, and spin degrees of freedom in transition metal oxides, the mechanism of high-temperature superconductivity, and the control of electronic phase behavior in metal-oxide superlattices. The department also develops new spectroscopic methods such as high-resolution neutron spectroscopy and spectral ellipsometry.

=== Nanoscale Science ===
Research efforts in the Department of Nanoscale Science, directed by Klaus Kern, are centered on nanometer-scale science and technology. The aim of the interdisciplinary research at the interface between physics, chemistry and biology is to gain control of materials at the atomic and molecular level, enabling the design of systems and devices with properties determined by quantum behavior on one hand and approaching functionalities of living matter on the other hand.

=== Nanochemistry ===
The Lotsch department employs modern techniques of nanochemistry and combines them with classical methods of solid-state synthesis to develop materials with complex property profiles, including two-dimensional systems and layered heterostructures, porous frameworks, photonic nanostructures, and solid electrolytes for applications in (photo)catalysis, sensing, and solid-state batteries.

=== Physical Chemistry of Solids ===
Under Joachim Maier, the Department of Physical Chemistry of Solids is concerned with electrochemistry and ion transport. Emphasis is laid on ion conductors (such as inorganic or organic proton, metal ion and oxygen ion conductors) and mixed conductors (typically perovskites). The research ranges from the exploration of basic mechanisms to the design of materials for electrochemical applications (batteries, fuel cells, sensors). Of special significance is the scientific foundation of the field Nanoionics.

=== Solid State Quantum Electronics ===
Induced by quantum mechanical phenomena, heterostructures grown from complex materials have potential to create new electron systems. Many have unique properties that are not otherwise found in nature. The design, growth, and exploration of such electron systems are at the focus of the Department of Solid State Quantum Electronics spearheaded by Klaus von Klitzing. The group is led by Jochen Mannhart.

=== Quantum Many-Body Theory ===
Directed by Walter Metzner, Electronic properties of solids are analyzed and computed in the Department of Quantum Many-Body Theory with a main emphasis on systems where electronic correlations play a crucial role, such as cuprates, manganites and other transition metal oxides. Besides symmetry-breaking phase transitions leading to magnetism, orbital and charge order, or superconductivity, correlations can also cause electron localization and many other striking many-body effects not described by the independent electron approximation.

=== Quantum Materials ===
Entanglement of electrons in solids, in combination with details of the crystal lattice structure, produce a large variety of electronic phases, that are liquid, liquid-crystal and crystalline states of the charge and spin degrees of freedom. These complex electronic phases and the subtle differences among them very often give rise to novel functionality. The Department of Quantum Materials, led by Hidenori Takagi, is studying these novel phases in transition metal oxides and related compounds where the narrow d-bands, which give rise to strong electron correlations, in combination with the rich chemistry of such materials provide opportunities for new discoveries.

== Scientific members ==
- Ali Alavi
- Bernhard Keimer
- Klaus Kern
- Bettina Lotsch
- Joachim Maier
- Jochen Mannhart
- Walter Metzner
- Hidenori Takagi

== Research groups ==
13 research groups have been established at the institute since 2005:

- Organic Electronics (Hagen Klauk, since 2005)
- Ultrafast Nanooptics (Markus Lippitz, junior professorship at the University of Stuttgart, 2006–2014)
- Theory of Semiconductor Nanostructures (Gabriel Bester, 2007–2014)
- Tunneling Spectroscopy of Strongly Correlated Electron Materials (Peter Wahl, 2009–2014)
- Computational Approaches to Superconductivity (Lilia Boeri, 2009–2013)
- Solid State Nanophysics (Jurgen Smet, since 2011)
- Nanochemistry (Bettina Lotsch, 2011–2016)
- Dynamics of Nanoelectronic Systems (Sebastian Loth, Collaboration with the Center for Free-Electron Laser Science, 2011–2018)
- Nanoscale Functional Heterostructures (Ionela Vrejoiu, 2012–2015)
- X-ray spectroscopy of oxide heterostructures (Eva Benckiser, since 2014)
- Ultrafast Solid State Spectroscopy (Stefan Kaiser, junior professorship at the University of Stuttgart, since 2014)
- Electronic Structure of Correlated Materials (Philipp Hansmann, 2015–2018)
- Computational Quantum Chemistry for Solids (Andreas Grüneis, 2015–2018)

== International Max Planck Research School (IMPRS) ==
The International Max Planck Research School for Condensed Matter Science (IMPRS-CMS) is a joint program of the Max Planck Institute for Solid State Research (Max Planck Institut für Festkörperforschung) and the University of Stuttgart. The objective of the research school is research on condensed matter using advanced experimental and theoretical methods.

== Max Planck Graduate Center for Quantum Materials (GC-QM) ==
Several Max Planck Institutes all across Germany contribute to the overall research activities in this field, and the Max Planck Graduate Center for Quantum Materials builds on the complementary research activities at the participating institutes.

== Max Planck Center ==
The Max Planck-EPFL Center for Molecular Nanoscience and Technology serves as a forum for cooperative research by bringing together scientists of the Max Planck Society and the Ecole Polytechnique Federale de Lausanne (EPFL). The center explores novel scientific aspects of molecular nanostructures with a particular focus on new science relevant for sustainable energy, chemical sensing and biomedical technologies.

The Max Planck-UBC-UTokyo Center for Quantum Materials is a collaborative venture between the Max Planck Society (Germany), University of British Columbia (Canada), and the University of Tokyo (Japan).

== Emeritus scientific members ==
- Ole Krogh Andersen (1978–2012)
- Martin Jansen (1998–2012)
- Klaus von Klitzing
- Hans-Joachim Queisser (1970–1997)
- Arndt Simon (1974–2010)
- Peter Wyder (1984–2001)

== Infrastructure ==
The Institute employs approximately 450 people, including 110 scientists, 90 PhD students and 70 guest scientists.
