= Rubidium silver iodide =

Chemical compound

Identifiers
CAS Number	12267-44-6
3D model (JSmol)	Interactive image
ChemSpider	13164094
PubChem CID	16035495
- InChI: InChI=1S/4Ag.5HI.Rb/h;;;;5*1H;/q4*+1;;;;;;+1/p-5 Key: NJUYEUPEDXDAHC-UHFFFAOYSA-I
- SMILES: [Rb+].[Ag+].[Ag+].[Ag+].[Ag+].[I-].[I-].[I-].[I-].[I-]

Properties
Chemical formula	Ag_{4}I_{5}Rb
Molar mass	1151.4630 g·mol^{−1}
- Except where otherwise noted, data are given for materials in their standard state (at 25 °C [77 °F], 100 kPa). Infobox references

Rubidium silver iodide is a ternary inorganic compound with the formula RbAg_{4}I_{5}. Its conductivity involves the movement of silver ions within the crystal lattice. It was discovered by Dr. Boone B. Owens while searching for chemicals which had the ionic conductivity properties of alpha-phase silver iodide at temperatures below 146 °C for AgI.

RbAg_{4}I_{5} can be formed by melting together or grinding together stoichiometric quantities of rubidium iodide and silver(I) iodide. The reported conductivity is 25 siemens per metre (that is a 1×1×10 mm bar would have a resistance of 400 ohms along the long axis).

The crystal structure is composed of sets of iodine tetrahedra; they share faces through which the silver ions diffuse.

RbAg_{4}I_{5} was proposed around 1970 as a solid electrolyte for batteries, and has been used in conjunction with electrodes of silver and of RbI_{3}. Its conductivity does not exhibit substantial variation with changes in relative humidity.

Rubidium silver iodide family is a group of compounds and solid solutions that are isostructural with the RbAg_{4}I_{5} alpha modification. Examples of such advanced superionic conductors with mobile Ag^{+} and Cu^{+} cations include KAg_{4}I_{5}, NH_{4}Ag_{4}I_{5}, K_{1−x}Cs_{x}Ag_{4}I_{5}, Rb_{1−x}Cs_{x}Ag_{4}I_{5}, CsAg_{4}Br_{1−x}I_{2+x}, CsAg_{4}ClBr_{2}I_{2}, CsAg_{4}Cl_{3}I_{2}, RbCu_{4}Cl_{3}I_{2} and KCu_{4}I_{5}.
