= Kangding =

Kangding 康定市 · དར་མདོ་གྲོང་ཁྱེར། Dartsedo, Tachienlu
- County-level city
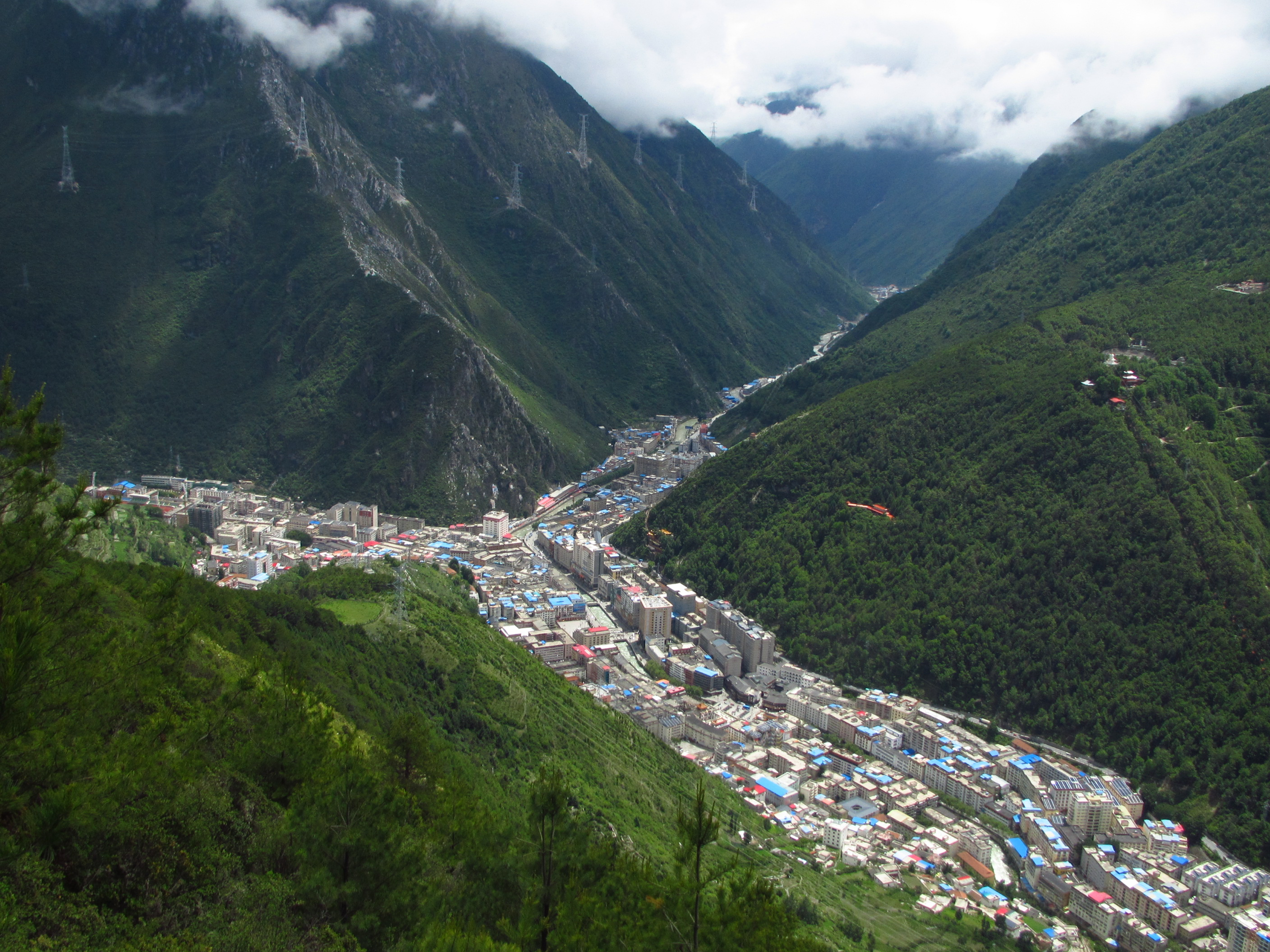
- Kangding from above

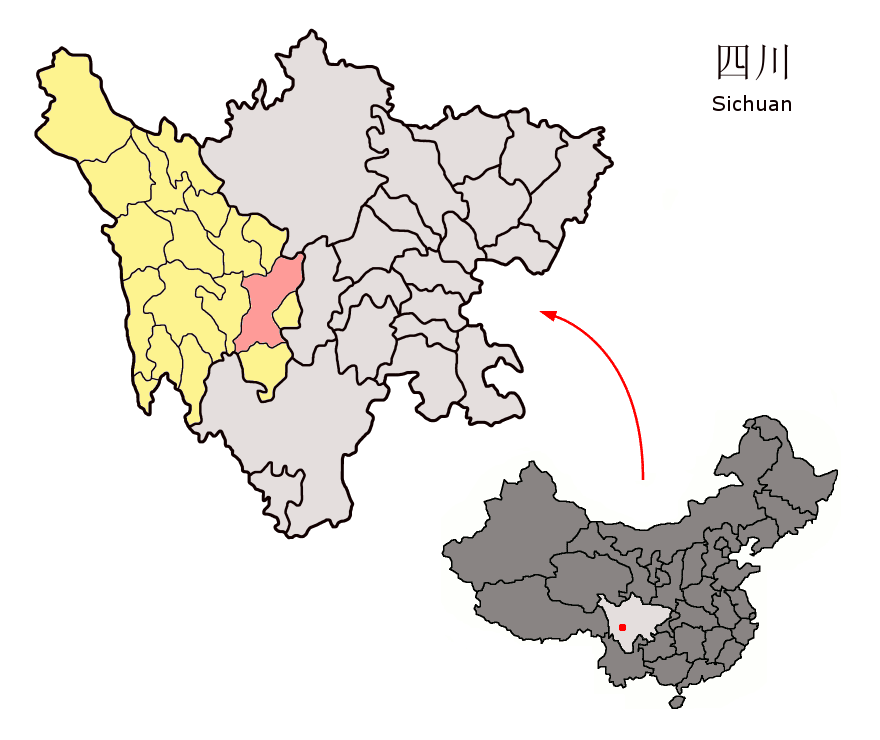
- Location of Kangding City (red) within Garzê Tibetan Autonomous Prefecture (yellow) and Sichuan

- Location of the city center in Sichuan Kangding (China)
- Coordinates (Kangding government): 29°59′55″N 101°57′25″E
- Country: China
- Province: Sichuan
- Autonomous prefecture: Garzê
- Municipal seat: Lucheng Subdistrict

Area
  - Total: 11,486 km^{2} (4,435 sq mi)
- Elevation: 2,560 m (8,400 ft)

Population (2020)
  - Total: 126,785
  - Density: 11.038/km^{2} (28.589/sq mi)
  - Major ethnic groups: Han; Tibetan
- Time zone: UTC+8 (China Standard)
- Postal code: 610000
- Website: www.kangding.gov.cn

Kangding

Chinese name
- Chinese: 康定
- Hanyu Pinyin: Kāngdìng
- Postal: Kangting
Transcriptions
Standard Mandarin
- Hanyu Pinyin: Kāngdìng
- Wade–Giles: Kʻang^{1}-ting^{4}

Dartsedo (Darzêdo)
- Simplified Chinese: 打箭炉
- Traditional Chinese: 打箭爐
- Hanyu Pinyin: Dǎjiànlú
Transcriptions
Standard Mandarin
- Hanyu Pinyin: Dǎjiànlú
- Wade–Giles: Ta^{3}-chien^{4}-lu^{2}

Tibetan name
- Tibetan: དར་རྩེ་མདོ།
Transcriptions
- Wylie: dar rtse mdo
- Tibetan Pinyin: Darzêdo

Kangding (Chinese: 康定), also known as Dartsedo (Tibetan: དར་རྩེ་མདོ།), is a county-level city and the seat of Garzê Tibetan Autonomous Prefecture in Sichuan province of Southwest China. Kangding is on the bank of the Zheduo River and has been considered the historical border between the Kham region of Tibet and the Sichuan region. Kangding's urban center is called Lucheng, which has around 134,000 inhabitants.

== Names ==
Historically, the urban center was known in Chinese as Dajianlu (Chinese: 打箭炉, also transliterated Tachienlu or Tatsienlu) from the Chinese transliteration of the Tibetan name Dartsedo or Darzêdo.

== History ==
Kangding was on the historical border between Tibet and China. From Kangding to the west lies Tibetan civilization, whereas to the east are Han cultural areas. It was the capital of the Kingdom of Chakla. During its history, Kangding has witnessed many conflicts between Tibetan and Han polities. Kangding was for many centuries an important trading city where Han brick tea was carried by porters from Chengdu and other centres to trade for Tibetan wool. A dispute involving the sovereignty over the city between Tibet and the Qing was resolved when the Manchu forces took the city by storm in the Battle of Dartsedo in 1701.

On July 1, 1786 an earthquake of 7.75 on the Moment magnitude scale ruined nearly the entire city.

"Tachienlu is surely sui generis; there can be no other town quite like it. Situated eight thousand four hundred feet above the sea, it seems to lie at the bottom of a well, the surrounding snow-capped mountains towering perhaps fifteen thousand feet in the air above the little town which, small as it is, has hardly room to stand, while outside the wall there is scarcely a foot of level ground. It is wedged into the angle where three valleys come together, the Tar and the Chen rivers meeting just below the town to form the Tarchendo, and our first view of the place as we turned the cliff corner that here bars the gorge, was very striking, grey walls and curly roofs standing out sharply from the flanking hillsides."

The city was renamed 'Kangding' in 1904. The American author Dorris Shelton Still, author of Sue in Tibet, was born here.

During the time of the Republic of China administration, Kangding was the capital of the now-defunct province of Xikang.

Dartsedo was particularly famous in France under the name 'Tatsienlou' in the 19th and early 20th century as famous French travellers visited it, such as Alexandra David-Néel, Joseph Gabet and Évariste Huc, Gabriel Bonvalot and prince Henri d'Orléans or Victor Segalen.

Electronic composer Kangding Ray takes his artist name from Kangding.

== Climate ==
Kangding City has a highland climate, with cold winters and cool summers. Affected by the monsoon, it is rainy in summer and dry in winter.

Kangding has a monsoon-influenced climate, lying in the transition between a humid continental (Dwb) and a subtropical highland climate (Cwb) on the Köppen system. Despite the elevation of 2,560 metres (8,400 ft), the diurnal temperature variation averages at most 10.6 °C (19.1 °F) in any month. From April to September, rain is a very common occurrence, with around two-thirds of the days receiving some rainfall; in addition, 77% of the annual precipitation is delivered from May to September. Monthly daily average temperatures range from −1.9 °C (28.6 °F) in January to 15.7 °C (60.3 °F) in July; the annual mean is 7.29 °C (45.1 °F). Over the course of the year, the frost-free period lasts 177 days and there are 1,738 hours of sunshine. The highest temperature ever recorded in Kangding was a high temperature record of 30.1 °C (86.2 °F) measured on March 30, 2007.

Climate data for Kangding, elevation 2,616 m (8,583 ft), (1991–2020 normals, extremes 1971–2010)
Month	Jan	Feb	Mar	Apr	May	Jun	Jul	Aug	Sep	Oct	Nov	Dec	Year
Record high °C (°F)	22.2 (72.0)	23.2 (73.8)	30.1 (86.2)	27.5 (81.5)	29.4 (84.9)	27.2 (81.0)	28.3 (82.9)	28.5 (83.3)	26.4 (79.5)	22.5 (72.5)	22.0 (71.6)	21.2 (70.2)	30.1 (86.2)
Mean daily maximum °C (°F)	4.0 (39.2)	6.9 (44.4)	10.5 (50.9)	14.8 (58.6)	16.9 (62.4)	18.6 (65.5)	20.6 (69.1)	20.7 (69.3)	17.2 (63.0)	12.8 (55.0)	9.6 (49.3)	5.3 (41.5)	13.2 (55.7)
Daily mean °C (°F)	−1.9 (28.6)	0.5 (32.9)	3.9 (39.0)	8.2 (46.8)	11.2 (52.2)	13.7 (56.7)	15.8 (60.4)	15.7 (60.3)	12.5 (54.5)	8.1 (46.6)	3.8 (38.8)	−0.5 (31.1)	7.6 (45.7)
Mean daily minimum °C (°F)	−5.6 (21.9)	−3.6 (25.5)	−0.2 (31.6)	3.7 (38.7)	7.1 (44.8)	10.4 (50.7)	12.4 (54.3)	12.2 (54.0)	9.5 (49.1)	5.2 (41.4)	0.2 (32.4)	−4.1 (24.6)	3.9 (39.1)
Record low °C (°F)	−13.8 (7.2)	−13.8 (7.2)	−11.2 (11.8)	−4.5 (23.9)	−1.3 (29.7)	1.5 (34.7)	2.7 (36.9)	1.0 (33.8)	0.2 (32.4)	−3.1 (26.4)	−7.3 (18.9)	−12.4 (9.7)	−13.8 (7.2)
Average precipitation mm (inches)	5.2 (0.20)	15.5 (0.61)	36.5 (1.44)	69.3 (2.73)	113.7 (4.48)	183.0 (7.20)	131.0 (5.16)	113.9 (4.48)	132.6 (5.22)	59.9 (2.36)	14.8 (0.58)	4.7 (0.19)	880.1 (34.65)
Average precipitation days (≥ 0.1 mm)	6.5	8.8	13.5	16.5	19.7	23.6	21.3	19.1	19.2	14.1	7.1	4.6	174
Average snowy days	13.0	13.3	12.4	4.6	0.7	0	0	0	0.1	1.7	6.4	10.2	62.4
Average relative humidity (%)	65	64	68	69	73	79	78	77	81	80	72	66	73
Mean monthly sunshine hours	145.9	123.7	144.1	156.7	153.2	114.4	126.7	138.3	109.3	110.4	131.3	145.0	1,599
Percentage possible sunshine	45	39	39	40	36	27	30	34	30	32	42	46	37
Source 1: China Meteorological Administration
Source 2: Weather China

== Administrative divisions ==
Kangding is divided into 2 subdistricts, 8 towns and 7 townships:

Name	Simplified Chinese	Hanyu Pinyin	Tibetan	Wylie	Administrative division code
Subdistricts
Lucheng Subdistrict (Dochong)	炉城街道	Lúchéng Jiēdào	མདོ་གྲོང་ཁྲོམ་ལམ།	mdo grong khrom lam	513301001
Yulin Subdistrict (Xalunggo)	榆林街道	Yúlín Jiēdào	གཞའ་ལུང་འགོ་ཁྲོམ་ལམ།	gzhav lung vgo khrom lam	513301002
Towns
Kuzhag Town (Goja, Guza)	姑咱镇	Gūzá Zhèn	གུ་བྲག་གྲོང་རྡལ།	gu brag grong rdal	513301101
Ra'ngaka Town (Xinduqiao)	新都桥镇	Xīndūqiáo Zhèn	ར་རྔ་ཁ་གྲོང་རྡལ།	ra rnga kha grong rdal	513301102
Dagang Town (Tagong, Lhagang)	塔公镇	Tǎgōng Zhèn	ལྟ་སྒང་གྲོང་རྡལ།	lta sgang grong rdal	513301103
Sadê Town (Shade)	沙德镇	Shādé Zhèn	ས་བདེ་གྲོང་རྡལ།	sa bde grong rdal	513301104
Gyitang Town (Jintang)	金汤镇	Jīntāng Zhèn	སྐྱིད་ཐང་གྲོང་རྡལ།	skyid thang grong rdal	513301105
Jagkai Town (Jiagenba)	甲根坝镇	Jiǎgēnbà Zhèn	ལྕགས་གད་གྲོང་རྡལ།	lcags gad grong rdal	513301106
Kanggar Town (Gonggashan)	贡嘎山镇	Gònggāshān Zhèn	གངས་ཀར་རི་བོ་གྲོང་རྡལ།	gangs kar ri bo grong rdal	513301107
Gotang Town (Yutong)	鱼通镇	Yútōng Zhèn	མགོ་ཐང་གྲོང་རྡལ།	mgo thang grong rdal	513301108
Townships
Yagra Township (Yala)	雅拉乡	Yǎlā Xiāng	གཡག་རྭ་ཤང་།	g.yag rwa shang	513301201
Maiba Township (Naibung, Maibeng)	麦崩乡	Màibēng Xiāng	སྨད་པ་ཡུལ་ཚོ།	smad pa yul tsho	513301205
Pogtag Township (Pengta)	捧塔乡	Pěngtǎ Xiāng	ཕོག་ཐག་ཤང་།	phog thag shang	513301208
Basêgrong Township (Pusharong)	普沙绒乡	Pǔshāróng Xiāng	དཔའ་སྲེག་རོང་ཤང་།	dpav sreg rong shang	513301211
Ju'gyi Township (Jiju)	吉居乡	Jíjū Xiāng	ཅུ་དཀྱིལ་ཤང་།	cu dkyil shang	513301212
Gagba Township (Gaba)	呷巴乡	Gābā Xiāng	འགག་པ་ཤང་།	vgag pa shang	513301214
Kobyü Township (Kongyu)	孔玉乡	Kǒngyù Xiāng	འཁོབ་ཡུལ་ཤང་།	vkhob yul shang	513301218

== Description ==
Kangding is located in a valley of the Tibetan Plateau about 210 kilometres (130 mi) west-southwest of Chengdu, the provincial capital, and 100 kilometres (62 mi) west of Ya'an. It is a city populated by significant proportions of both Tibetans and Han, and is part of the historical Tibetan region of Kham. The raging Zheduo River flows through the city, thus the constant sound of water reverberates throughout much of the city. At the north end of Kangding near the bus station the Zheduo River converges with the Yala River. The city features a sizable square, People's Square, where young and old alike gather in the early hours of the morning to do Tai Chi, play badminton, or socialise. This square comes alive on the weekends as well, when families tend to fill it. Traditional Tibetan and Sichuanese restaurants are easily found throughout the city. Dentok, a Tibetan Buddhist monastery sits on the Paoma Mountain overlooking the city, and is accessible by cable car. As of October 2006, a stone amphitheatre is under construction at the upper monastery.

It is a city with rapidly developing tourist infrastructure, including a cable car imported from Germany.

In 2008 the PRC government opened an airport at Kangding in the province of Sichuan, with a 4,000-metre (13,000 ft) runway. At the time this was the second-highest in the world, at 4,280 metres (14,040 ft) above sea level, with the highest position held by Qamdo Bamda Airport at 4,400m. Since 2013, with the opening of the Daocheng Yading Airport at an elevation 4,411m, Kangding Airport is the third highest in the world.

The folk song Kangding Qingge enjoys popularity throughout China. Since Kangding city was a major town for trading of cloth and tea between Tibetans and Han people. With the increase of trade in Kangding it also attracted more traders with different nationalities creating this culturally diverse city today. Therefore, singers also incorporate the music style of Tibet to acknowledge the diversity.

Kangding contains some notable Buddhist monasteries, including Nanwu Si Monastery, Anjue Monastery and Jinggang Monastery.

It was from 1857 the see of the Diocese of Kangding, administered by Paris Foreign Missions Society. The Catholic church was destroyed during the Cultural Revolution and rebuilt in the 1980s. Today it is no longer in use and has been converted to shops and a hotel.

== Transport ==
- Ganzi Kangding Airport
- China National Highway 318
- G4218 Ya'an–Yecheng Expressway (雅叶高速公路) Ya'an–Kangding Section
