= Environmental impacts of lithium-ion batteries =

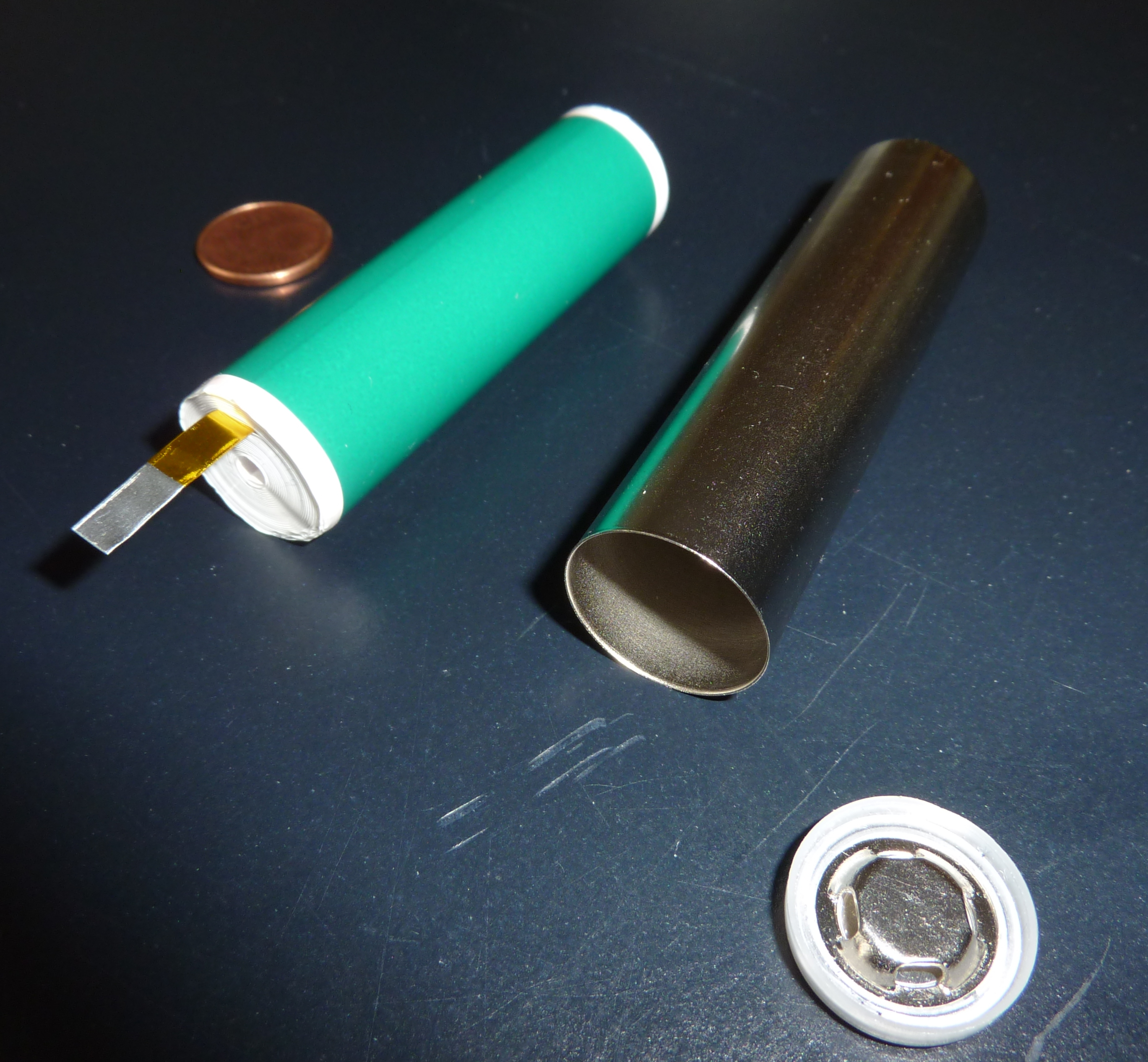
Disassembly of a lithium-ion cell showing internal structure

Lithium batteries are batteries that use lithium as an anode. This type of battery is also referred to as a lithium-ion battery and is most commonly used for electric vehicles and electronics.

While they are a means of moving the world towards sustainable energy usage (such as wind and solar energy), there are associated environmental impacts of traditional lithium extraction techniques.

While lithium-ion batteries can be used as a part of a sustainable solution, shifting all fossil fuel-powered devices to lithium-based batteries might not be the Earth's best option. There is no scarcity yet, but it is a natural resource that can be depleted. According to researchers at Volkswagen, there are about 14 million tons of lithium left, which corresponds to 165 times the production volume in 2018.

Traditional extraction methods include lithium mining from salt brines, lithium-rich clay, and ores. With these techniques, environmental impacts such as loss of freshwater through evaporation, release of harmful gases, chemical leakage, and many other adverse consequences.

In an attempt to minimize the harmful environmental impact of traditional methods, electrochemical extraction techniques have been developed. These methods both improve efficiency and have less secondary environmental impacts. Electrochemical extraction methods facilitates the dissolution of metal ions by utilizing the electric field. As such, it does not require the same level of heat and concentration of chemicals used in the traditional acid leaching. Electrochemical methods from brine lakes significantly reduces the time taken to obtain lithium, thus reducing the possibility of heavy metal leaching and depletion of fresh water sources.

== History ==
The first type of lithium battery was created by the British chemist M. Stanley Whittingham in the early 1970s and used titanium and lithium as the electrodes. Applications for this battery were limited by the high prices of titanium and the unpleasant scent that the reaction produced. Today's lithium-ion battery, modeled after the Whittingham attempt by Akira Yoshino, was first developed in 1985.

Tonnes of lithium and income generated from Australian lithium mining and exportation over the recent years

== Extraction ==
Lithium is extracted on a commercial scale from three principal sources: salt brines, lithium-rich clay, and hard-rock deposits. Each method incurs certain unavoidable environmental disruptions. Salt brine extraction sites are by far the most popular operations for extracting lithium, they are responsible for around 66% of the world's lithium production. The major environmental benefit of brine extraction compared to other extraction methods is that there is very little machinery needed to be used throughout the operation. Whereas hard-rock deposits and lithium-rich clays both require relatively typical mining methods, involving heavy machinery. Despite this benefit, all methods are continually used as they all achieve relatively similar recovery percentages. Brine extraction achieves a 97% recovery percentage whereas hard-rock deposits achieve a 94% recovery percentage.

=== Traditional extraction methods ===
==== Continental brine extraction ====
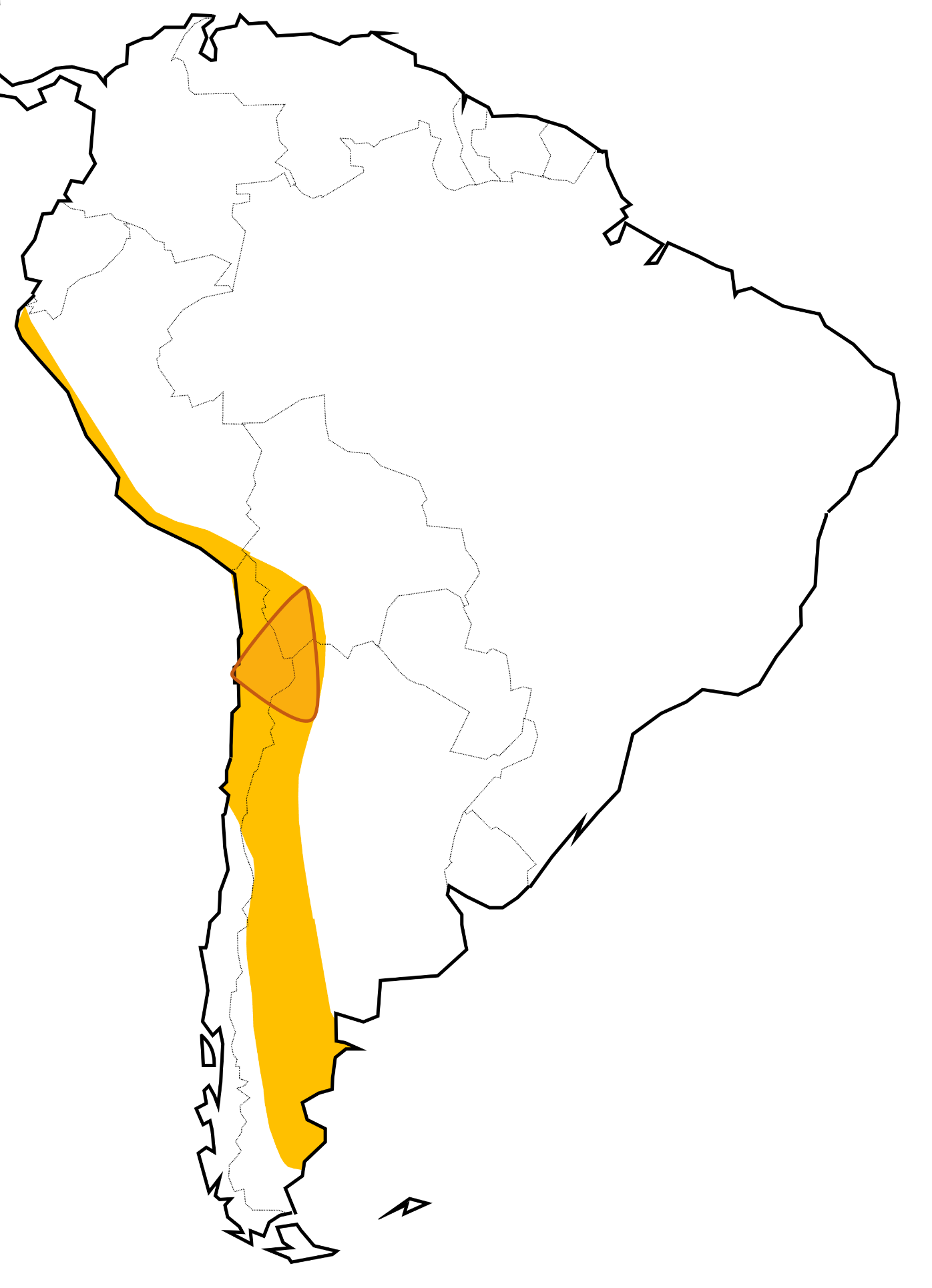
The Lithium Triangle in South America, which includes Argentina, Bolivia, and Chile

Brine extraction uses open-air evaporation to concentrate the brine over time. This results in large quantities of water being lost due to evaporation. It is worth noting that in general, this brine being evaporated has a very high salinity, making the water unusable for any agricultural or human consumption. Afterwards, the concentrated brine is moved to a nearby production facility to produce Li_{2}CO_{3} and LiOH•H_{2}O. These production facilities are responsible for the bulk of the atmospheric pollution caused by brine extraction sites, releasing harmful gasses such as sulphur dioxide into the air.

The majority of brine extraction sites are situated in South America, more specifically, in Chile and Argentina, where around half of the world's lithium reserves exist in a place referred to as the "lithium triangle". In Chile, the world's second-largest lithium producer, the nation's two active mines, run by Sociedad Química y Minera (SQM) and Albemarle, are both located on the Salar de Atacama salt flat in the Atacama Desert. Tests performed on the brines of these mines showed that the brine has ~350 g/L of total dissolved solids. Studies on this mine and the area's water tables have shown that the total water storage of Salar de Atacama decreased by -1.16 mm per year from 2010-2017. There is a complex divide among and within local communities, with some accepting payouts from the mining corporations and taking part in their community development initiatives, whilst others are either neglected by such programs or refuse the corporations' offers due to their aforementioned environmental concerns. In Tagong, a small town in Garzê Tibetan Autonomous Prefecture China, there are records of dangerous chemicals such as hydrochloric acid leaking into the Liqi River from the nearby lithium mining facilities. As a result, dead fish and large animals were seen floating down the Liqi River and other nearby rivers near the Tibetan mines. After further investigation, researchers found that this may have been caused by leakage of evaporation pools that sit for months and sometimes even years.

==== Hard-rock deposits ====
Lithium can also be extracted from hard-rock deposits. These deposits are most commonly found in Australia, the world's largest producer of lithium, through spodumene ores. Spodumene ores and other lithium-bearing hard-rock deposits are far less abundant throughout the world than continental brines. Although the deposits are far less commonly found and available for mining, the operating costs are very similar to the costs of operating a brine extraction operation. As a result, hard-rock deposit extraction sites are continuing to be created and used even though salt brines are much more common to find and typically bear a smaller environmental impact.

==== Lithium-rich clays ====
Extracting lithium from lithium-rich clays first involves mining the clays themselves which results in lots of atmospheric pollution. There are several minerals within clay that contain lithium such as, lepidolite, hectorite, masutomilite, zinnwaldite, swinefordite, cookeite, and jadarite. After extracting these minerals from the ground, the clays are processed to extract the lithium, this is typically done through chemical reactions like acidification. This chemical process can result in harmful gasses and chemicals being produced as byproducts which can easily result in pollution if not handled properly. Lithium-rich clays are the third major source of lithium, although they are far less abundant than salt brines and hard-rock ores containing lithium. To be exact, lithium-rich clays make up less than 2% of the world's lithium products. For comparison, brine extraction represents 39% and hard-rock ores represent 59% of the lithium production.

=== Electrochemical Methods ===
==== Electrochemical Leaching from Ores ====
With the rapid demand increase for lithium, it is critical to develop alternative methods of lithium extraction than conventional brine to form a reliable supply-chain. Hence, there has been development of a new extraction method called electrochemical leaching to minimize environmental footprint and energy consumption.

The main drawback of acid leaching is the high level of energy consumption used to reach the high temperatures required for calcination. Basic leaching methods, although requiring lower temperatures, need to separate impurities in an additional round of treatment. These limitations of chemical leaching methods call for new leaching techniques to reduce environmental impact.

Electrochemical leaching facilitates metal ion dissolution by using the electric field. It does not require the same high temperatures and high concentrations of leaching agents for reaction activation as acid leaching methods and thus has a lesser harmful environmental impact. It can also utilize wind/solar energy for electricity generation. A study conducted by researchers to test the efficacy of the new method found an efficiency of 92.2% was achieved.

==== Electrochemical Methods from Brines ====
Lithium extraction from ores uses a high level of energy and technical complexities, as such most of the world's lithium supply is extracted from brine lakes (~80%). Traditional mining methods have severe environmental consequences. The traditional extraction method of solar evaporation from salt brines is an extremely time consuming process, taking anywhere from 1-2 years. Meanwhile, this includes the evaporation and hence loss of freshwater, which can cause heavy metal leaching and local agricultural water deficiency.

Original methods of extraction from brine lakes are only feasible for low magnesium to lithium (Mg/Li) ratios. Electrochemical methods have been developed and employed for these brine lakes with higher Mg/Li ratios. CDI is an emerging technology which uses charged electrodes to absorb and remove ions from saline solutions. This method has low energy consumption, low cost, and no secondary chemical pollution. It removes ions from saline solutions by applying an electric field across two carbon electrodes, which attract cations and anions to their respective cathodes, thus successfully removing ions from the solution.

== Disposal ==
Some types of Lithium-ion batteries such as NMC contain metals such as nickel, manganese and cobalt, which are toxic and can contaminate water supplies and ecosystems if they leach out of landfills. Additionally, fires in landfills or battery-recycling facilities have been attributed to inappropriate disposal of lithium-ion batteries. As a result, some jurisdictions require lithium-ion batteries to be recycled. Despite the environmental cost of improper disposal of lithium-ion batteries, the rate of recycling is still relatively low, as recycling processes remain costly and immature. A study in Australia that was conducted in 2014 estimates that in 2012-2013, 98% of lithium-ion batteries were sent to the landfill.

== Recycling ==
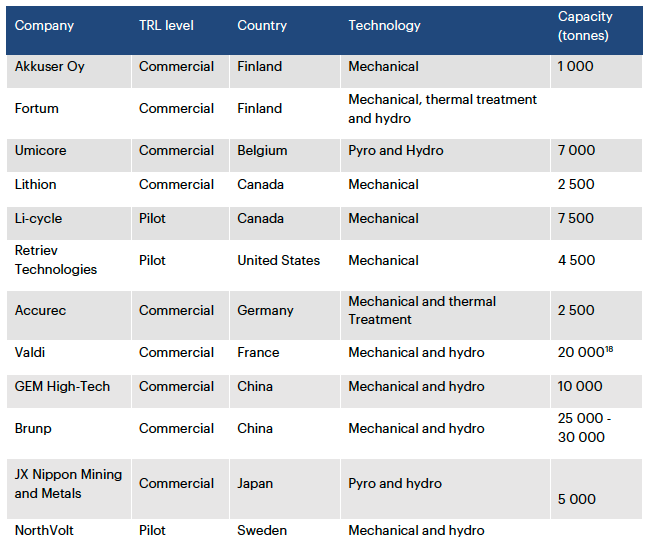
List of companies that are responsible for recycling lithium-ion batteries and the capacity of lithium-ion batteries they can intake.

Lithium-ion batteries must be handled with extreme care from when they're created, to being transported, to being recycled. Recycling is extremely vital to limiting the environmental impacts of lithium-ion batteries. By recycling the batteries, emissions and energy consumption can be reduced as less lithium would need to be mined and processed.

A 2024 review of 64 life cycle assessment studies found that comparisons of lithium-ion battery recycling technologies were affected by differences in system boundaries, data, and methodological assumptions. Electricity consumption and chemical inputs were identified as important contributors to the environmental impacts of recycling.

The EPA has guidelines regarding recycling lithium batteries in the U.S. There are different processes for single-use or rechargeable batteries, so it is advised that batteries of all sizes are brought to special recycling centers. This will allow a safer process of breaking down the individual metals that can be reclaimed for further use.

There are currently three major methods used for the recycling of lithium-ion batteries, those being pyrometallurgical recovery, hydrometallurgical metal reclamation, and mechanical recycling. A study conducted in 2016 with several recycling plants in Australia found that mechanical recycling recovered the most materials, recovering 7 of the 10 possible materials from lithium-ion batteries on average. This same study also found that hydrometallurgy recovered 6 out of 10 materials on average and pyrometallurgical processes recovered only half of the possible materials on average.

=== Pyrometallurgical recovery ===
The processes within the pyrometallurgical recovery include pyrolysis, incineration, roasting, and smelting. Right now, most traditional industrial processes are not able to recover lithium. The main process is to extract other metals including cobalt, nickel, and copper. There is a very low recycling efficiency in materials and use of capital resources. There are high energy requirements along with gas treatment mechanisms that will produce a lower volume of gas byproducts.

=== Hydrometallurgical metals reclamation ===
Hydrometallurgy uses chemical reactions to dissolve materials into a solution, which is later precipitated to retrieve the desired raw material. This method of recycling destroys all organic materials, such as plastic, during the process. That being said, Hydrometallurgy does achieve a very high purity in the recovered metals, making it a good recycling method. It is commonly used for copper recovery. This method has been used for other metals to help eliminate the problem of sulfur dioxide byproducts that more conventional smelting causes.

=== Direct/mechanical recycling ===
Direct or mechanical recycling involves breaking down old lithium-ion batteries to extract important, usable components and/or materials to be re-used with new batteries. This process involves shredding or crushing old batteries and then extracting the materials afterwards. This can lead to cross-contamination which can result in certain materials or components becoming unrecyclable. While this form of recycling is an option, it still generally remains more expensive than mining the ores themselves. With the rising demand for lithium-ion batteries, the need for a more efficient recycling program is detrimental with many companies racing to find the most efficient method. One of the most pressing issues is when the batteries are manufactured, recycling is not considered a design priority. The advantage of this recycling method is that it generally involves very little pollution if any from the process, whereas the previous two methods can both produce harmful chemicals and gasses.

== Application ==
There are many uses for lithium-ion batteries since they are light, rechargeable and are compact. They are mostly used in electric vehicles and hand-held electronics, but are also increasingly used in military and aerospace applications.

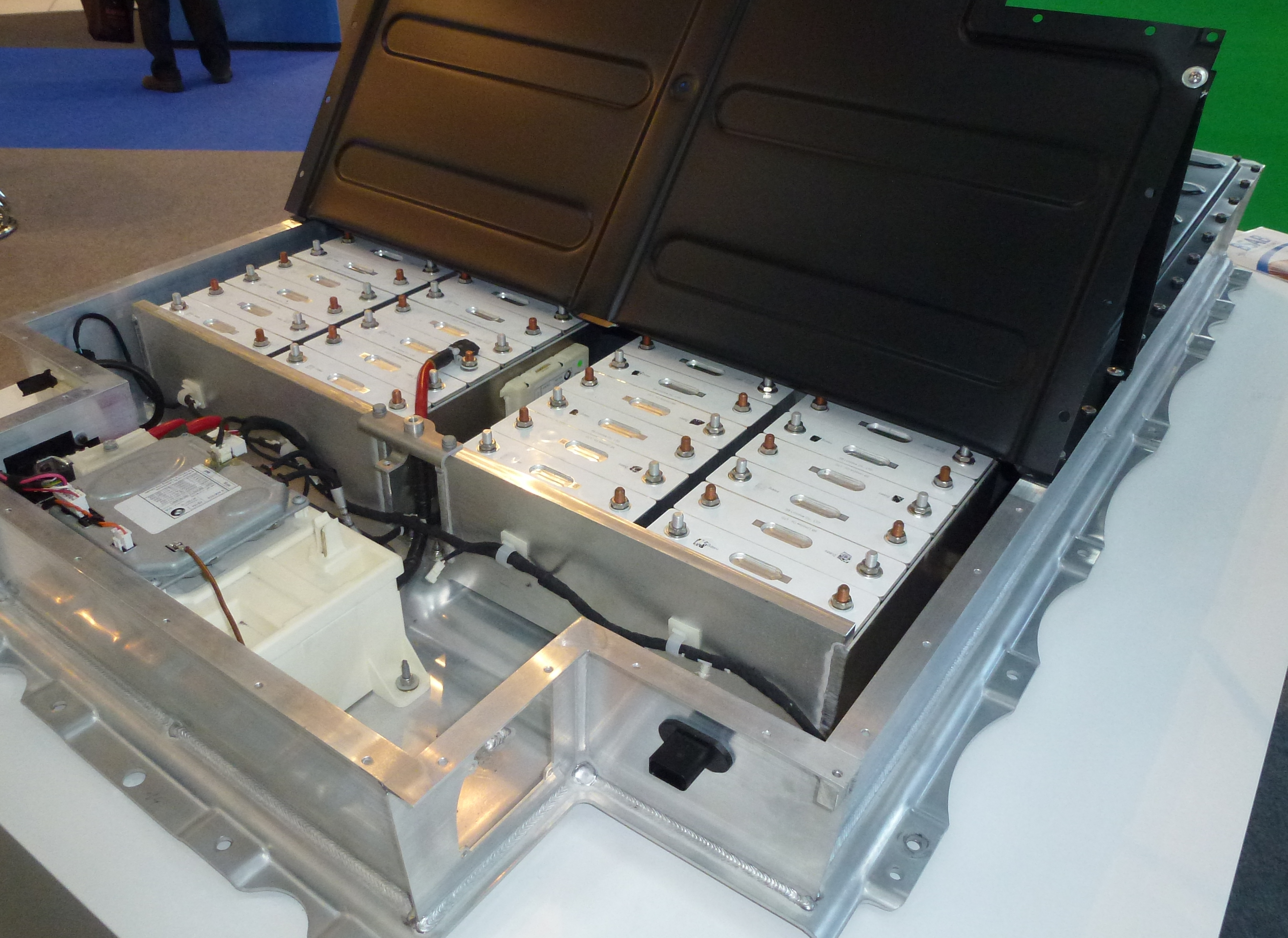
Battery pack in a BMW i3

=== Electric vehicles ===
The primary industry and source of the lithium-ion battery is electric vehicles (EV). Electric vehicles have seen a massive increase in sales in recent years with over 90% of all global car markets having EV incentives in place as of 2019. With this increase in sales of EVs and the continued sales of them we can see a significant improvement to environmental impacts from the reduction of fossil fuel dependencies. There have been recent studies that explore different uses for recycled lithium-ion batteries specifically from electric vehicles. Specifically the secondary use of lithium-ion batteries recycled from electric vehicles for secondary use in power load peak shaving in China has been proven to be effective for grid companies. With the environmental threats that are posed by spent lithium-ion batteries paired with the future supply risks of battery components for electric vehicles, remanufacturing of lithium batteries must be considered. Based on the EverBatt model, a test was conducted in China which concluded that remanufacturing of lithium-ion batteries will only be cost effective when the purchase price of spent batteries remains low. Recycling will also have significant benefits to environmental impacts. In terms of greenhouse gas reduction we see a 6.62% reduction in total GHG emissions with the use of remanufacturing.

== Environmental exposure ==
Lithium exposure is an emerging concern in the 21st century, driven by the rapid expansion of lithium mining and its extensive use in lithium-ion batteries for renewable energy and electric vehicles. While lithium is essential for the global green energy transition, growing evidence suggests it may also pose environmental and health risks when improperly managed.

A 2024 study titled Lithium Levels in Umbilical Cord Blood from Two Cities in China found unexpectedly high lithium concentrations in newborns, indicating unidentified, likely anthropogenic, sources of exposure. The findings suggest that lithium pollution may not be confined to occupational or mining sites, but could enter the human body through environmental pathways in urban areas, raising concerns about chronic low-level exposure during sensitive developmental periods.

During 2021, a series of mass protests broke out in Serbia against the construction of a lithium mine in Western Serbia by the Rio Tinto corporation. In 2024, an EU backed lithium mining project created large scale protests in Serbia.

A 2021 study states how lithium batteries during disassembly and recyclizing process emit harmful dust emission. Generally, dust is a mixture of solid particles and liquid droplets of a wide range of sizes (nanometres to few micrometres) and chemical composition, all together suspended in the atmosphere.167,168 Particulate matter with aerodynamic diameters of less than 10 or 2.5[thin space (1/6-em)]μm (PM10 and PM2.5) can jeopardize human health, adversely affect climate and reduce visibility at local and regional scales.

== See also ==
- Aluminium-ion battery
- Glass battery
- Lithium–sulfur battery
- Potassium-ion battery
- Sodium-ion battery
