= Henri, Count of Paris =

Henri, Count of Paris, Henri d'Orleans and Henri, Duke of France are all names taken by recent claimants to the French throne.

- Henri, Count of Paris (1908–1999)
- Henri, Count of Paris (1933–2019), his son

== See also ==
- Henri d'Orléans (disambiguation)
