= Jiju =

Jiju may refer to:

- Jijū (侍従) or Chamberlains, chief functionaries of the Imperial Household Agency of Japan, see Board of Chamberlains
- Jilin opera or Jiju (吉剧), a Chinese opera genre from Jilin
- Jiju Township (吉居乡), a township in Kangding, Sichuan, China
- Ji Ju (姬鞠, fl. 22nd century BC?), a legendary noble of the Xia dynasty
