= Lithium battery =

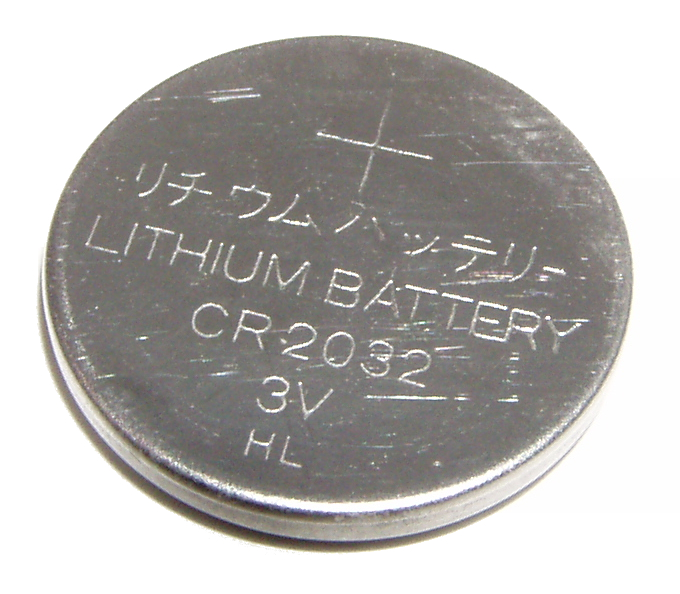
Lithium Battery CR2032

Lithium battery may refer to:

- Lithium metal battery, a non-rechargeable battery with lithium as an anode
  - Lithium–air battery
  - Lithium–iron disulfide battery
  - Lithium–sulfur battery
  - Nickel–lithium battery
  - Rechargeable lithium metal battery, a rechargeable counterpart to the lithium metal battery
- Lithium-ion battery, a rechargeable battery in which lithium ions move from the negative electrode to the positive electrode during discharge and back when charging
  - Aqueous lithium-ion battery
  - Lithium-ion flow battery
  - Lithium ion manganese oxide battery
  - Lithium polymer battery
  - Lithium–silicon battery
  - Lithium-titanate battery
  - Lithium vanadium phosphate battery
  - Thin-film lithium-ion battery, a solid-state lithium-ion battery constructed as a thin-film
  - Lithium iron phosphate battery
  - Lithium hybrid organic battery

== See also ==
- Glass battery, which may use a lithium metal electrode
- High capacity oceanographic lithium battery pack
- List of battery types
- Lithium batteries in China
- Subtopics of the lithium-ion battery:
  - Environmental impacts of lithium-ion batteries
  - History of the lithium-ion battery
  - Nanoarchitectures for lithium-ion batteries
  - Research in lithium-ion batteries
