= Gabriel Bonvalot =

French explorer (1853–1933)

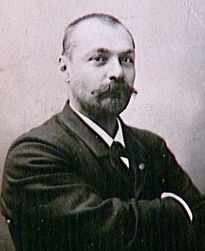
Gabriel Bonvalot photograph by Eugène Pirou.

Pierre Gabriel Édouard Bonvalot (13 July 1853 – 10 December 1933) was a French explorer of Central Asia and Tibet. Bonvalot was born in the commune of Épagne in the Aube department in north-central France. He was the son of Pierre Bonvalot and Louise-Félicie, née Congniasse des Jardins. He attended schooling at Troyes.

== Expeditions from 1880-1887 ==
In 1880–1882 he visited Russian controlled Central Asia and returned to France via Bukhara, the Caspian Sea, and the Caucasus. His travels were financed by the Minister of Public Instruction. In 1886, he set out for Russian Central Asia with Guillaume Capus, a botanist, ethnographer, and doctor of natural sciences, and designer Albert Pépin.

They departed from Tashkent in 1886 and traveled up to the border with Afghanistan. During the winter season, they remained in Samarkand and sought a way to cross the Pamir Mountains from north to south and reach China. In 1887 they crossed through Kyrgyz territory in the Alai Mountains. As a European, Bonvalot felt superior to the locals and used threats or force to obtain equipment, supplies, pack animals and porters. He crossed the Pamirs, Chitral, where he was detained for more than a month, and the Karakoram, until he reached Kashmir. He was rewarded for this expedition by the Société de Géographie in Paris.

== Expedition of 1889 ==
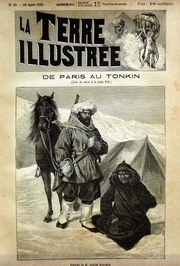
« De Paris au Tonkin. » Cover of La Terre illustrée with Bonvalot, March 14, 1891.

In 1889 Bonvalot was one of the first Europeans to visit the Tibetan Plateau. The expedition was financed by the Duke of Chartres and his son, Prince Henri of Orléans. who accompanied Bonvalot.

Bonvalot's original plan was to cross Asia and reach Tonkin in French Indochina. Bonvalot wanted to cross Europe and Russia by train and then continue on foot and horseback to the border with Chinese Turkestan. Bonvalot then wanted to be the first European to cross the Gobi and Lop Nor deserts. He thought that he could then cut across the Tibetan Plateau and try to visit Lhasa, which had been closed to foreigners for the last half a century. Finally he intended to cross 1,700 kilometers of land in eastern Tibet that had been unexplored by Europeans until he reached Yunnan, where he would travel down the Mekong River to Indochina. In total his planned expedition was 9,500 kilometers and traversed lands that were still unknown to Europeans. Bonvalot was accompanied in his travels by a Belgian missionary, Father De Deken (1852–1896, who spoke Chinese and joined the expedition to reach Shanghai with his Chinese servant), an Uzbek assistant, Rachmed, who joined the expedition in Russia, Abdoullah a translator, and Prince Henri of Orléans, who acted as his photographer and botanist.

The expedition began with relative comfort and did not become difficult until they reached the border between Russian and Chinese Turkestan. The group crossed into Chinese controlled territory and traveled through the Ili River valley, Tian Shan Mountains, the Tarim Basin, and the Lop Nor. They then had to spend the winter in Tibet. Bonvalot's expedition again coerced the population into providing horses and guides and even threatened the local commander with imprisonment. Just before they reached Lhasa, they were detained by officials of the Tibetan government. They were not allowed to enter Lhasa and Bonvalot's expedition was only allowed to continue its journey after lengthy negotiations. The group then continued traveling across the Tibetan Plateau to its eastern extremities. In June they finally reached Kangding in Qing controlled territory. They finally reached Hanoi in late September 1890.

== Later career ==
Gabriel Bonvalot wanted by his expeditions financed by the French government in order to demonstrate French power in the eyes of the world. After a trip to French Algeria in 1893 Bonvalot embraced nationalism and became a fervent supporter of the idea of colonialism which was unanimously supported by the Republican politicians of that time and French colonists. In 1894 he founded the Comité Dupleix, a pro-colonialist organization. In 1898 Bonvalot launched an expedition to cross Ethiopia and join the Marchand expedition at Fashoda. But Bonvalot failed to obtain the cooperation of the Ethiopian emperor, Menilek II, and quit the expedition before they reached Sudan. In 1898 Bonvalot founded the journal La France de demain and remained the editor until 1904. He served as a deputy from Paris in the Parliament of France from 1902 to 1906. From 1912 to 1920 Bonvalot was the mayor of Brienne-le-Château in his home department of Aube. In 2005 an exhibition on the life of Bonvalot was organized in the library at Brienne-le-Château. Bonvalot died in Paris on 10 December 1933.

== Publications ==
Most of his books were translated in English.

- En Asie Centrale. De Moscou en Bactriane (1884)
- En Asie Centrale. Du Kohistan à la Caspienne (1885)
- Du Caucase aux Indes, à travers le Pamir (1888)
- Through the Heart of Asia Over the Pamir to India (1889)
- De Paris au Tonkin à travers le Tibet inconnu, ouvrage contenant cent huit illustrations d'après les photographies prises par le prince Henri d'Orléans (1892)
- L'Asie inconnue, à travers le Tibet (1896)
- Sommes-nous en décadence ? (1899)
- Propos d'un Français (1911)
- Une lourde tâche (1913)
- Voyages. Les Chercheurs de routes. Marco-Polo (1924)

== In popular culture ==
=== Literature ===
- Race to Tibet by Sophie Schiller (2015) ISBN 978-0692254097
