= Lithium hybrid organic battery =

Lithium hybrid organic batteries are an energy storage device that combines lithium with an organic polymer. For example, polyaniline vanadium (V) oxide (PAni/V_{2}O_{5}) can be incorporated into the nitroxide-polymer lithium iron phosphate battery, PTMA/LiFePO_{4}. Together, they improve the lithium ion intercalation capacity, cycle life, electrochemical performances, and conductivity of batteries.

== PAni/V2O5 ==
Oxides, like V_{2}O_{5}, are used as cathodes in rechargeable lithium batteries. Crystalline V_{2}O_{5} has a weaker rechargeability or cyclability than amorphous V_{2}O_{5} because the crystal structure is damaged during discharge/charge cycles. However, amorphous oxides, in particular the V_{2}O_{5} xerogel, allows lithium ions to diffuse faster and thus have a better cyclability. Hybrid is formed by combining a conducting organic polymer (e.g. polyaniline) with an oxide (e.g. V_{2}O_{5}).

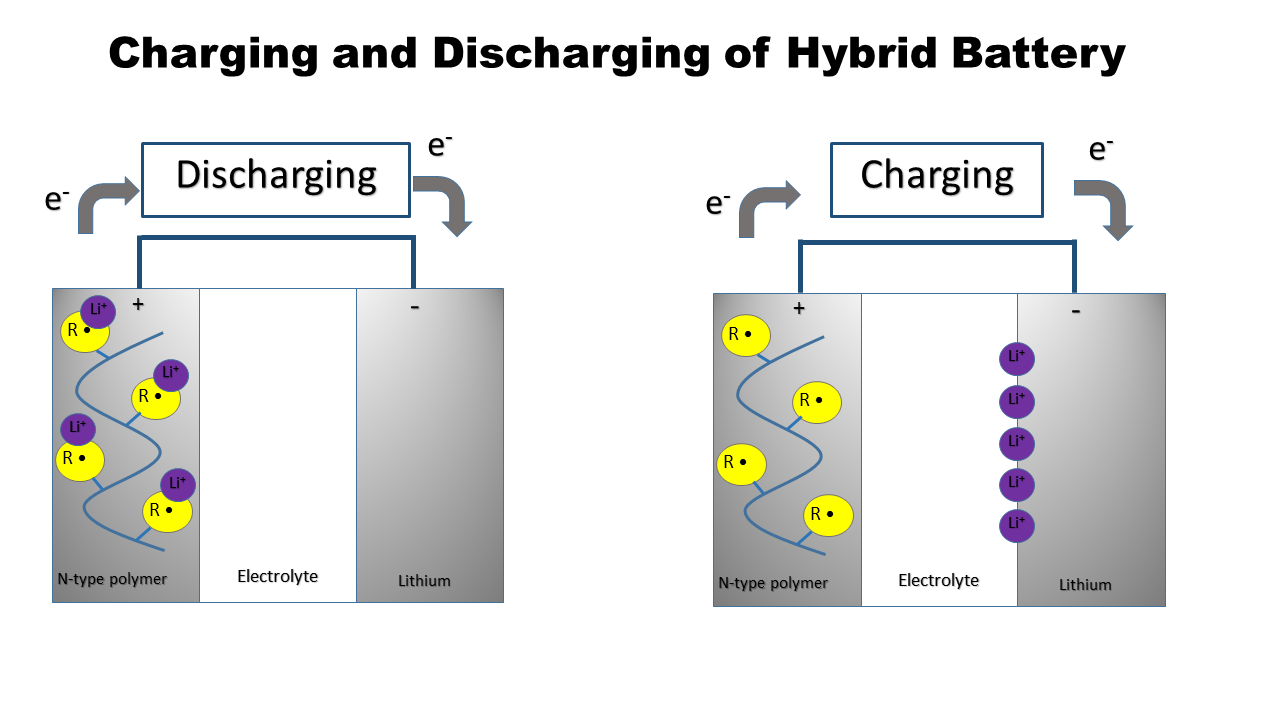
Figure 1: Diagram of charging and discharging of hybrid battery

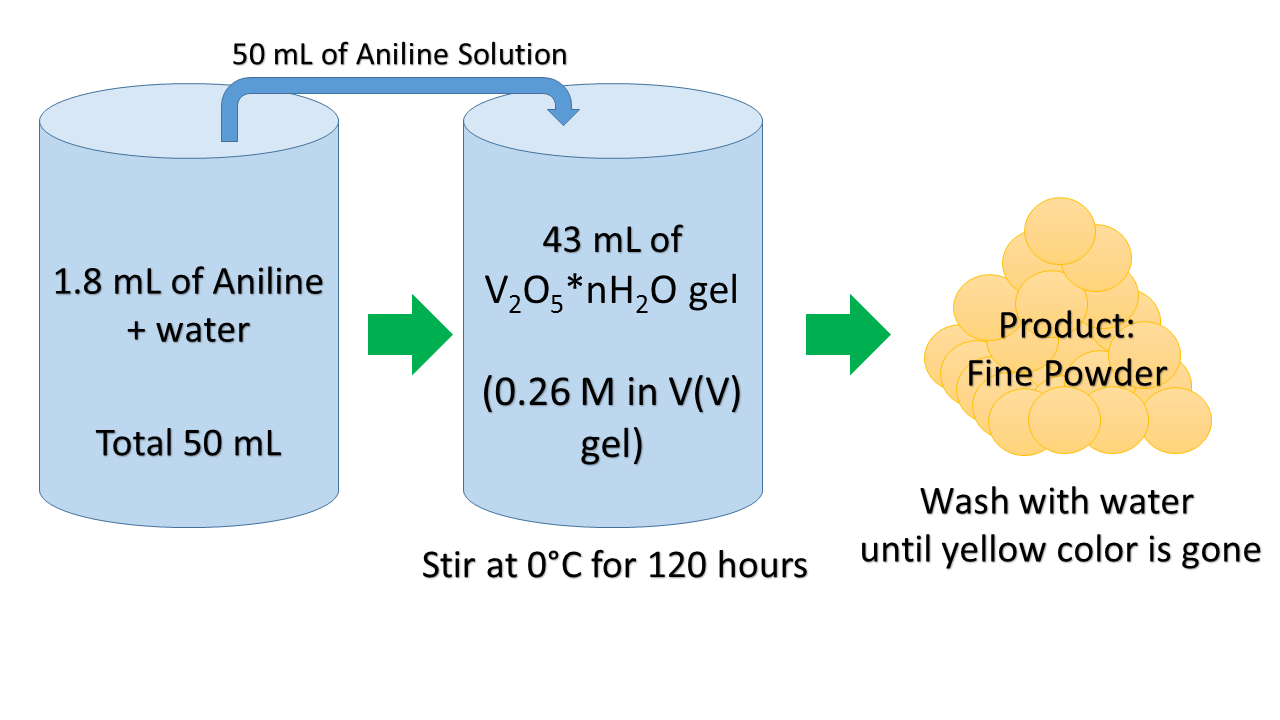
Figure 3: Exact protocol for V_{2}O_{5} gels

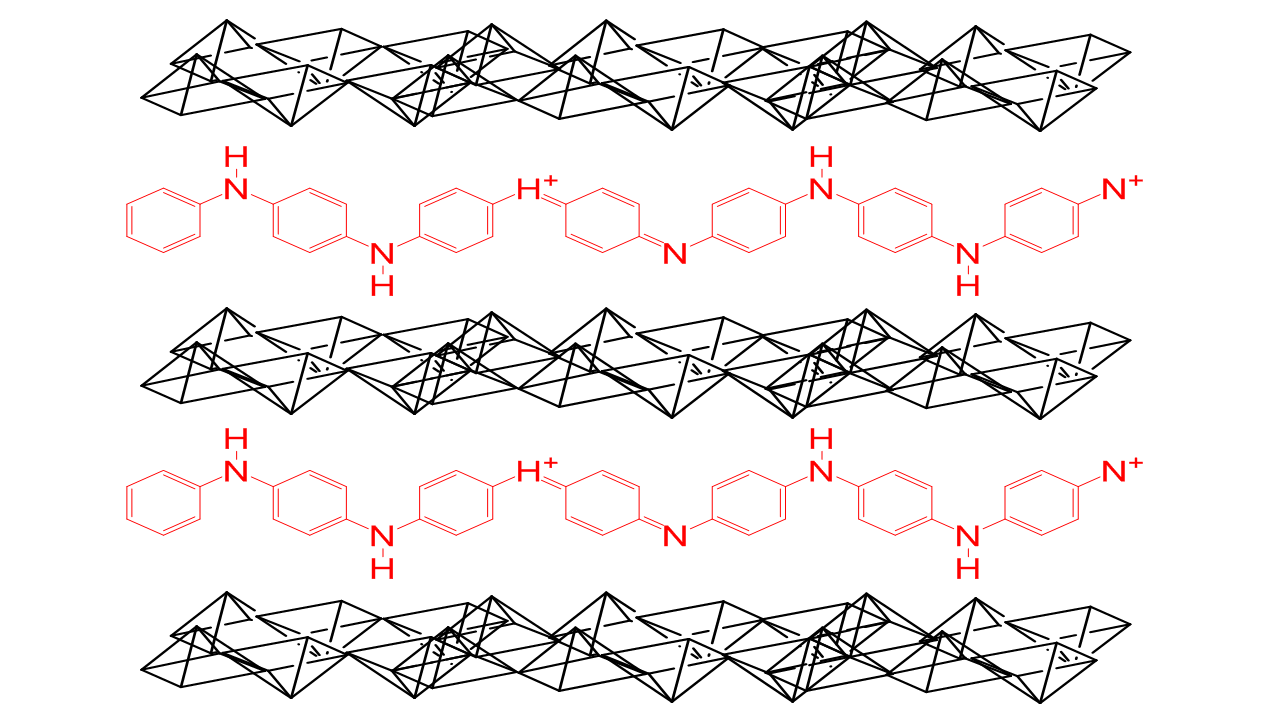
Figure 2: Polyaniline/V_{2}O_{5}, where V_{2}O_{5} is represented in black and polyaniline is represented in red

V_{2}O_{5} gels are prepared using the ion-exchange method. Vanadium (V) polymerizes aniline. Before synthesis of a hybrid battery, potentiometric titration of V_{2}O_{5} gel with $\ce{(NH4)2Fe(SO4)2*6H2O}$ is carried out; this determines the amount of V(V) present in the gel. Aniline solution is slowly added onto the $\ce{V2O5*\mathit{n}H2O}$ gel. The following procedure is demonstrated in Figure 3.

V_{2}O_{5} is used because of its high specific capacity, high thermal stability, and high structural flexibility with lithium. Up to three moles of lithium ions can be added into the V_{2}O_{5} lattice to create different structures. The structures created give the hybrid a long battery life. However, the intercalation capacity depends on the moderate electrical conductivity and low diffusion coefficient of the lithium ions in the vanadium oxide matrix.

Polyaniline is easily produced to have controlled structural and electronic properties. Polyaniline eliminates the coordinated water of the V_{2}O_{5} xerogel, so more lithium ions can be integrated into the structure. The organic part of the PAni/V_{2}O_{5} hybrid degrades with the increase of temperature.

V(V) is reduced to V(IV), and aniline is oxidized to polyaniline. Re-oxidizing V(IV) to a higher oxidation state of V(V) increases initial cell voltage and specific capacity. Since polyaniline is an electrochemically active component, it improves the specific charge of the hybrid material. Combining polyaniline with V_{2}O_{5} yields a larger specific charge difference. Thus, a greater total capacity contribution than V_{2}O_{5} alone. Furthermore, the hybrid has a higher specific capacity than that of the V_{2}O_{5} xerogel. Electrical conductivity is as high as 0.09 S/cm for 15 days.

As a result, PAni/V_{2}O_{5} hybrid is a conducting network and an electroactive material in the composites, which improves electrochemical behavior. It also prevents the irreversible structural changes made by redox cycling when the lithium ions enter the lattice. Moreover, this hybrid also has a high specific capacity and improved cyclability without capacity deterioration.

== PTMA/LiFePO_{4} ==
PTMA is an organic nitroxide radical electrode-active polymer, and LiFePO_{4} is the inorganic electrode-active material. PTMA is used because it has a high capacity and a long cycle life. To synthesize organic radical-inorganic hybrid electrodes, electrode environments for each component must be optimized. PTMA and LiFePO_{4} were combined with entire PTMA and LiFePO_{4} electrode with different weight ratios: 25/75, 50/50, and 75/25.

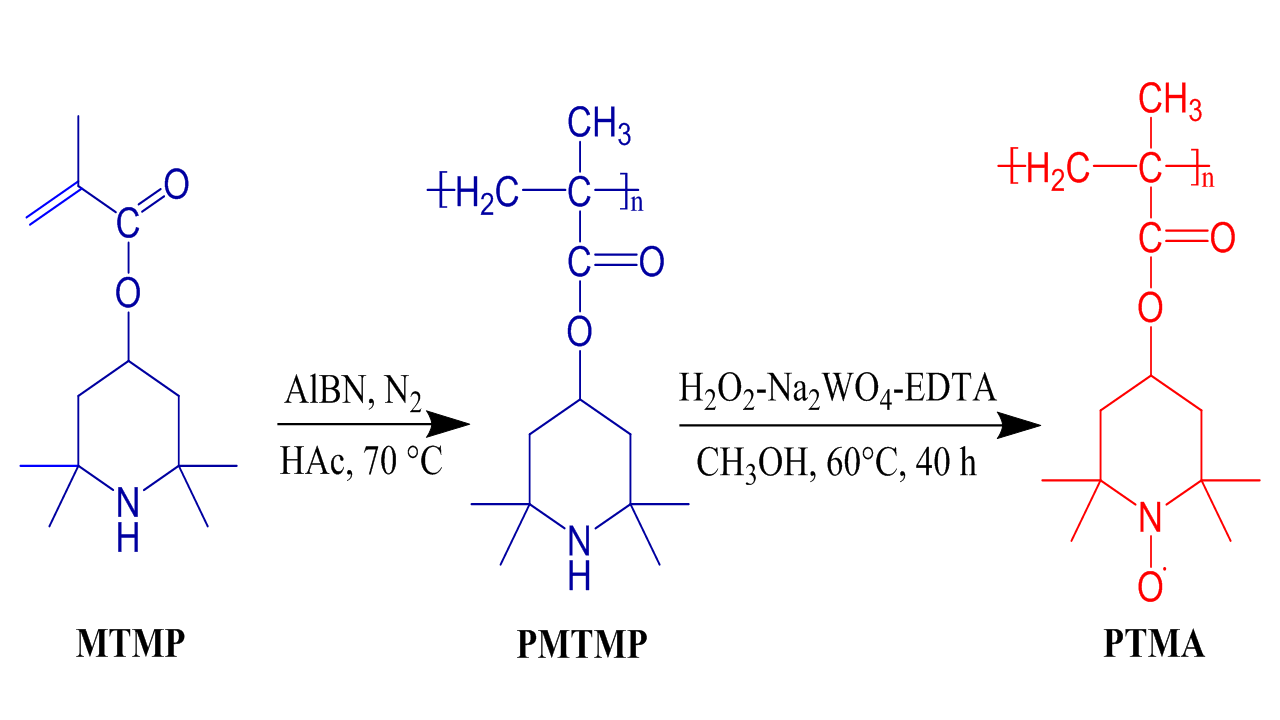
Figure 4: Synthesis of PTMA- MTMP monomer (2,2,6,6-tetramethylpiperidine methacrylate)

The cell was prepared by using a working electrode to assemble a half-cell configuration dry glove box with Li metal as an anode, ethyl carbonate/dimethyl carbonate as an electrophile, and a Celgard 3501 membrane as a separator. Using Arbin BT-200 Battery Tester, the cell was electrochemically cycled at room temperature. By using a Solarton workstation, the cyclic voltammetry and electrochemical impedance spectroscopy of cells were performed. A focus ion beam-scanning electron microscope was used to determine the morphology of the electrodes before and after the high rate pulse discharge (HRPD) cycling.

After testing, pure PTMA and LiFePO_{4} electrode give a sharp redox peak and decrease the voltage gap between oxidation and reduction. Therefore, PTMA and LiFePO_{4} improve the rate and reversibility of the redox couples. Furthermore, the hybrid cathodes have a lower charge-transfer resistance, allowing easier migration of Li ions through the electrode interface. Moreover, PTMA/LiFePO_{4} has a longer life cycle compared to pure LiFePO_{4} or PTMA systems.
