= Constant de Deken =

Belgian colonial explorer, anthropologist and missionary

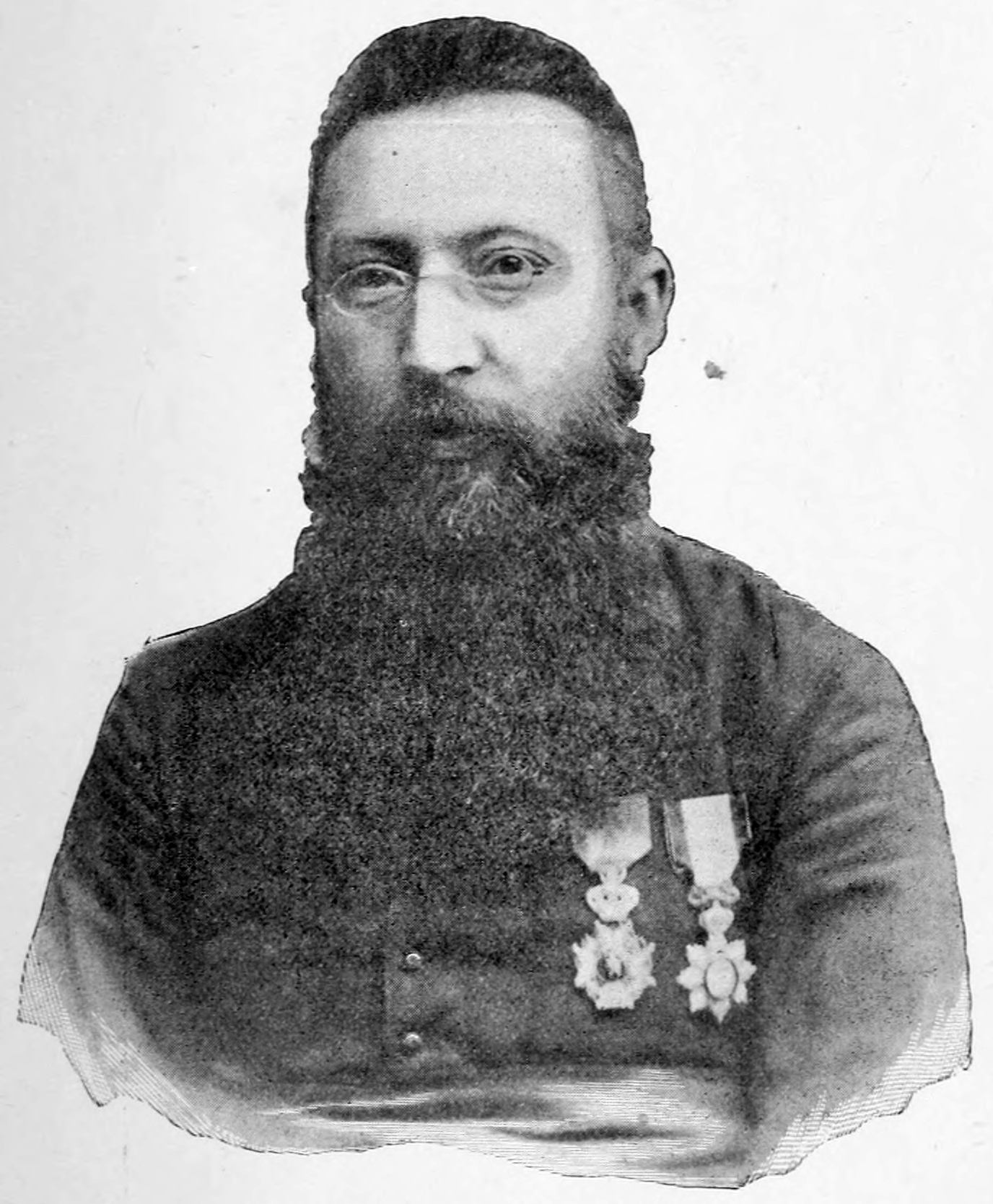
Constant de Deken

Constant Pierre-Joseph De Deken (7 March 1852 – 3 March 1896) was a Belgian colonial explorer, anthropologist and Roman Catholic missionary.

== To China ==
De Deken was born in Wilrijk. The son of Ludovicus De Deken and Maria-Theresia Van Dyck, he studied theology at the major seminary of Mechelen, then he made his novitiate in the Scheutist Fathers congregation in 1877. He was ordained Priest in June 1879 and took his final vows in March 1881. He was called to go to China to christianize the population. He was first sent to the Mission sui juris of I-li in Chinese Turkestan (under the administration of the Apostolic Vicariate of Kan-Su-Koukounor, now Gansu). Scheutist fathers had been present in China since 1865 and wanted to expand their ministry to the northwest. Then followed a short period of study in Lanzhou to improve his Chinese. From April 1882 De Deken tried to evangelize the region of Sichuan, making tours from the parish of Kuldja. He stayed there until 1889.

In 1889 De Deken joined a scientific expedition in Turkestan of Gabriel Bonvalot (accompanied by Prince Henri of Orléans, as botanist and photographer) along with his Chinese servant Bartholomeus. De Deken spoke Chinese and served as interpreter. The goal was to reach Shanghai via Central Asia, Tibet and Tonkin, which was completed in September 1890. De Deken then separated from the explorers and headed on a boat to Haiphong, eventually to return to France. These were the first modern European explorations penetrating the high Tibetan plateau, away from the roads which had been done before by Father Huc and later Nikolai Przewalski. This expedition was unprecedented, having traveled six thousand kilometers and recovering botanical collections that were subsequently studied at the National Museum of Natural History in Paris. A year later Father De Deken left China and returned to the Scheutist Fathers congregation in Brussels for a year. He published a description of his journey in a book (written in French) titled Across Asia (1891).

== To Congo ==
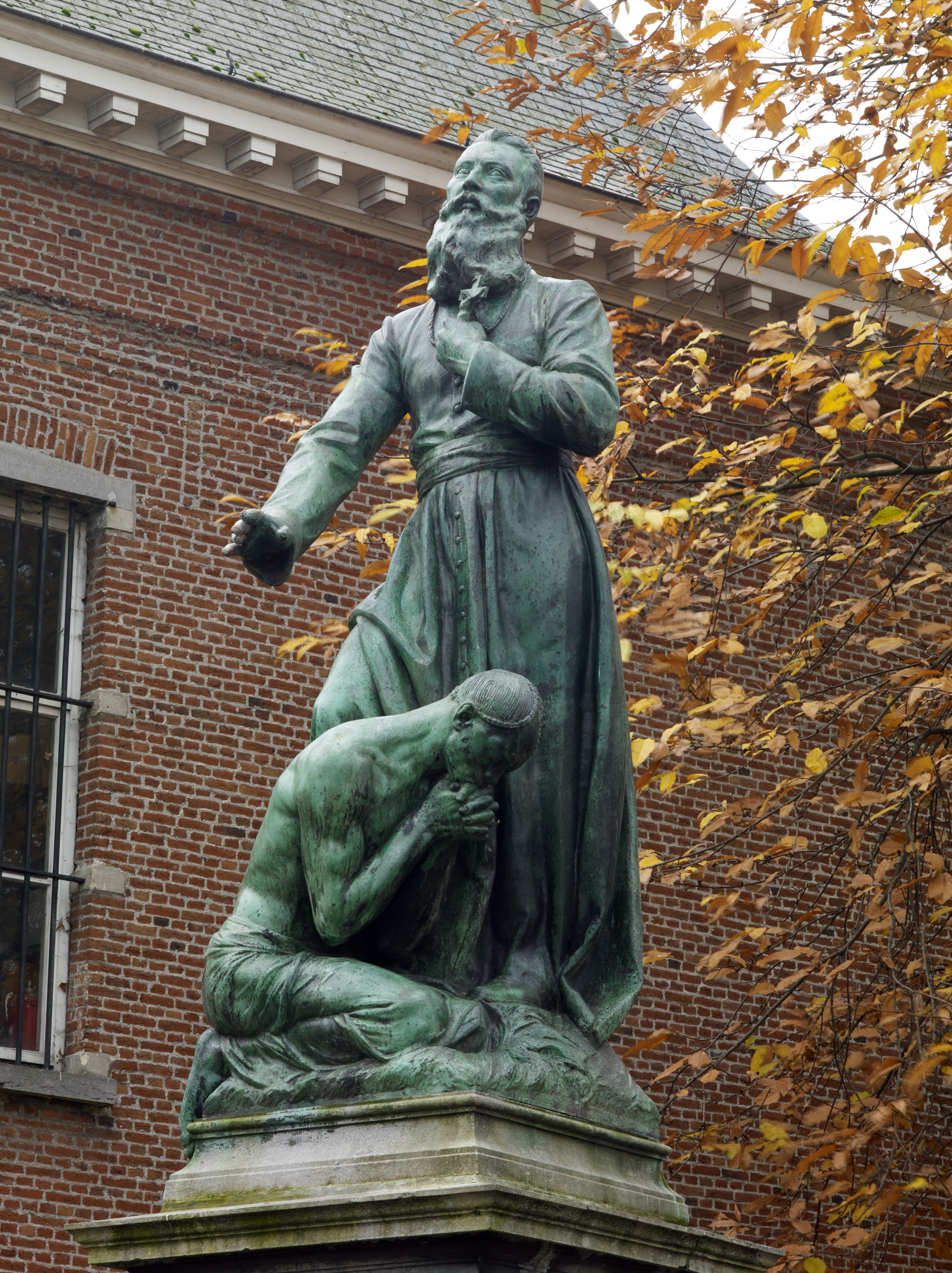
Constant De Deken statue, Wilrijk, Belgium (1904)

De Deken left Belgium again in June 1892, this time to king Leopold's domain, Congo Free State, where Scheutists had been present since 1889. There he was appointed to Boma in central Congo. De Deken tried to christianize the Congolese. To this end, he founded a monastery in Luluaburg. But his health began failing. He was in Brussels from autumn 1894 to autumn 1895. Subsequently, he returned to Congo, where he arrived in November 1895. He died in Boma on 3 March 1896, a few days before celebrating his forty-four years of age.

De Deken wrote down his experiences during his first period in Congo in his second book (written in Dutch) titled Two Years in Congoland.

== Honors and controversy ==
De Deken was honored Knight in the Order of Leopold (Belgium).

In Wilrijk there is a monument in honor of De Deken, standing with a knee on top of the back of a praying native Congolese. The statue is heavily disputed since 2014. In 2020 it was vandalized with paint. There is another statue of De Deken in Antwerp.

== Novel ==
- Race to Tibet by Sophie Schiller (2015) ISBN 978-0692254097

== See also ==
- Christianity in Chinese Turkestan
- Catholic Church in Sichuan
- Catholic Church in the Democratic Republic of the Congo

== Sources ==
- Gazet van Antwerpen (newspaper) 1899, 2009, 2013 and 2017 (in Dutch)
- De Deken, C., Twee jaren in Congoland, Antwerp, Clément Thibaut, 1900 (in Dutch)
- De Deken, C., À travers l'Asie, Antwerp, Clément Thibaut, 1902 (in French)
