= Henri d'Orléans =

Henri d'Orléans may refer to:

- Henry II of France (1519–1559), a French king of the house of Valois
- Henri I d'Orléans, duc de Longueville (1568–1595), a French aristocrat and soldier
- Henri d'Orléans, Duke of Aumale (1822–1897), fifth son of King Louis-Philippe of France
- Prince Henri of Orléans (1867–1901), a French aristocrat and explorer
- Henri, Count of Paris (1908–1999), a former pretender to the French throne
- Henri, Count of Paris (1933–2019), a pretender to the French throne
