= Kangding Qingge =

Traditional folk song of Kangding, Sichuan, China

- Chinese: 康定情歌
- Literal meaning: Love Song of Kangding
Transcriptions
Standard Mandarin
- Hanyu Pinyin: Kāngdìng qínggē
- Bopomofo: ㄎㄤ ㄉㄧㄥˋ ㄑㄧㄥˊ ㄍㄜ
- Wade–Giles: K'ang^{1}-ting^{4} Ch'ing^{2}-ko^{1}

"Kangding Qingge" (Chinese: 康定情歌; pinyin: Kāngdìng Qínggē; Wade–Giles: K'ang^{1}-ting^{4} Ch'ing^{2}-ko^{1}), or "Kangding Love Song", is a traditional folk song of Kangding, Sichuan Province. The song is one of the most popular songs across the Sinosphere.

== History ==
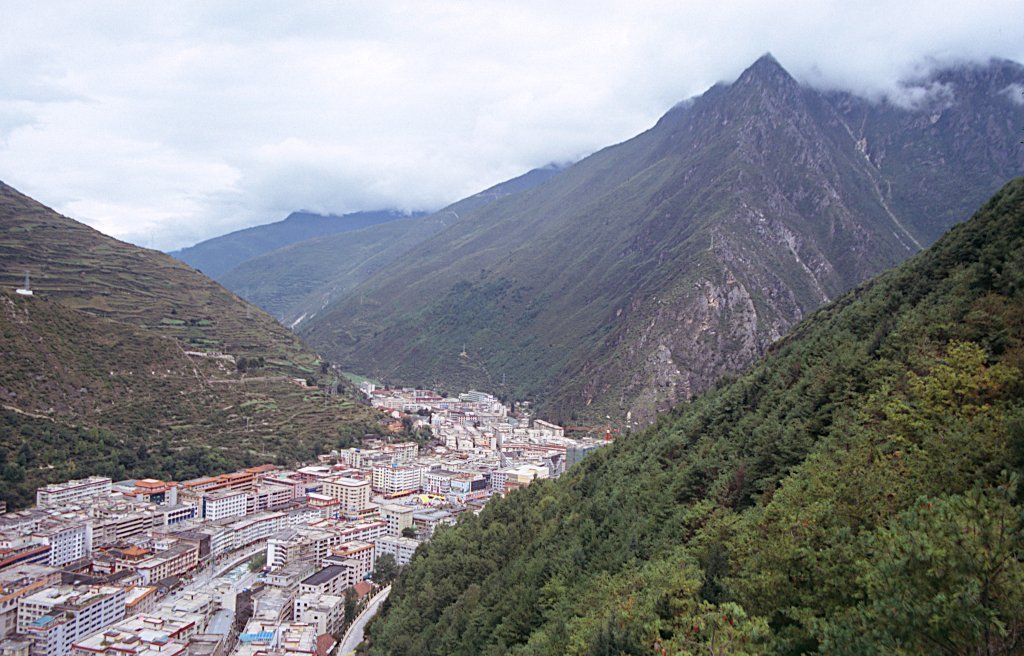
Kangding in 2004

In 1946, while studying vocal music in Sikang Province, the Quanzhou native Wu Wen-ji 吳文季 had collected the song Paoma Liuliude Shanshang 跑馬溜溜的山上 (On the Running Horse Mountain) amongst other local folk songs. While teaching at a Kuomintang military academy, Wu scored and renamed the song as "Kangding Love Song", after the capital of the Sikang Province 西康省. The song was then spread to the rest of China after being performed by then popular soprano Yu Yixuan 喻宜萱.

The song has been performed or covered by many famous artists around the world, including Placido Domingo, Timi Zhuo, and A-mei.

== Lyrics ==
| Lyrics in Simplified Chinese: | Lyrics in Traditional Chinese: | Lyrics in Mandarin Pinyin: | English translation: | Chords |
|---|---|---|---|---|
| 跑马溜溜的山上，一朵溜溜的云哟。 端端溜溜的照在，康定溜溜的城哟。 月亮弯弯，康定溜溜的城哟！ 李家溜溜的大姐，人才溜溜的好哟。 张家溜溜的大哥，看上溜溜的她哟。 月亮弯弯，看上溜溜的她哟！ 一来溜溜的看上，人才溜溜的好哟。 二来溜溜的看上，会当溜溜的家哟。 月亮弯弯，会当溜溜的家哟！ 世间溜溜的女子，任我溜溜的爱哟。 世间溜溜的男子，任你溜溜的求哟。 月亮弯弯，任你溜溜的求哟！ | 跑馬溜溜的山上、一朵溜溜的雲喲。 端端溜溜的照在、康定溜溜的城喲。 月亮彎彎、康定溜溜的城喲！ 李家溜溜的大姐、人才溜溜的好喲。 張家溜溜的大哥、看上溜溜的她喲。 月亮彎彎、看上溜溜的她喲！ 一來溜溜的看上、人才溜溜的好喲。 二來溜溜的看上、會當溜溜的家喲。 月亮彎彎、會當溜溜的家喲！ 世間溜溜的女子、任我溜溜的愛喲。 世間溜溜的男子、任你溜溜的求喲。 月亮彎彎、任你溜溜的求喲！ | Pǎomǎ liūliūde shānshàng, yīduǒ liūliūde yún yō. Duānduān liūliūde zhàozài, Kāngdìng liūliūde chéng yō. Yuèliang wān wān, Kāngdìng liūliūde chéng yō! Lǐjiā liūliūde dàjiě, réncái liūliūde hǎo yō. Zhāngjiā liūliūde dàgē, kànshàng liūliūde tā yō. Yuèliang wān wān, kànshàng liūliūde tā yō! Yīlái liūliūde kànshàng, réncái liūliūde hǎo yō. Èrlái liūliūde kànshàng, huìdàng liūliūde jiā yō. Yuèliang wān wān, huìdàng liūliūde jiā yō! Shìjiān liūliūde nǚzǐ, rènwǒ liūliūde ài yō. Shìjiān liūliūde nánzǐ, rènnǐ liūliūde qiú yō. Yuèliang wān wān, rènnǐ liūliūde qiú yō! | High upon the mountain side, floats a cloud so white. There lies kangding town, bathed in silver moonlight. Moonlight shines bright, over kangding town. Lovely maid with a sweet smile, Li the woodcutter's daughter. Zhang the blacksmiths eldest's son, came to court her in moonlight. Moonlight shines bright, a courtship in moonlight. First, he has fallen in love because she is talented and good-looking. Second, he has fallen in love because she can take care of the family. The crescent moon, can take care of the family! Lovely maidens of the world, I cannot but love you. Gentlemen of the world, they cannot but woo you. Moonlight shines bright, they cannot but woo you. | Each verse: Dm Cm Dm Dm Cm Gm Am Dm Gm Am Dm Gm Am Dm |

== In popular culture ==
- The song was featured in an episode of the T.V. series Daredevil Season 01 Episode 05 titled "World On Fire".
- The song "Runaway Train", from the soundtrack of the 2003 video game, Command and Conquer: Generals, samples this song.
- This song is also sampled in a soundtrack of Dynasty Warriors 4, a video game by Koei.
- The song "Fuji I (Global Dub)", from the album Akron/Family II: The Cosmic Birth and Journey of Shinju TNT by Akron/Family features a re-imagined version of this song.
- The song also appears, mixed, in a video of Mandarin Oriental Luxury Hotel Hong Kong
- The song "The Smooth Love Song" (溜溜的情歌), from the album Hui Wei (回蔚) by Karen Mok, samples this song.
- The song "Kangding Love Song and Liuliu Tune" remix by Tan weiwei on I Am A Singer season 3, Ep9 in 2015.
- Sammo Hung sings a portion of the song in the movie Dragons Forever.
- This song is sampled in the Metal Slug 6 original soundtrack, "Asian Impact".
