= Lucheng, Kangding =

Subdistrict in Sichuan, China

Lucheng 炉城街道 · མདོ་ཁྲིན་རྡལ།
- Subdistrict
- Lucheng Subdistrict
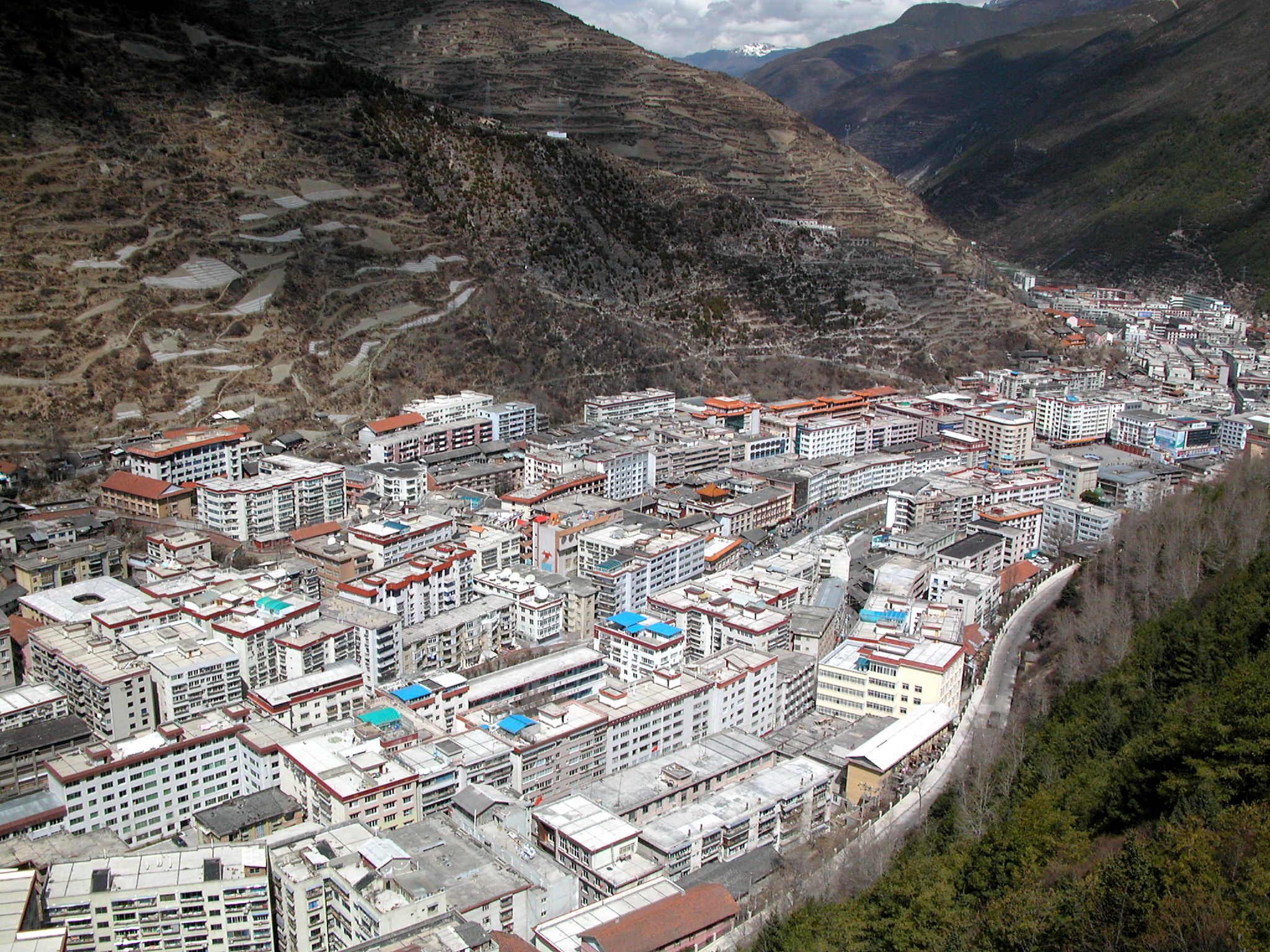
- View of Lucheng

- Location in Sichuan
- Coordinates: 30°03′19″N 101°57′53″E
- Country: People's Republic of China
- Province: Sichuan
- Autonomous prefecture: Garzê Tibetan Autonomous Prefecture
- County-level city: Kangding
- Elevation: 2,560 m (8,400 ft)

Population (2010)
  - Total: 41,399
  - Major Nationalities: Han; Tibetan
- Time zone: UTC+8 (China Standard)
- Postal code: 610000
- Website: www.kangding.gov.cn

Lucheng/Dartsedo

Chinese name
- Simplified Chinese: 炉城
- Traditional Chinese: 爐城
Transcriptions
Standard Mandarin
- Hanyu Pinyin: Lúchéng

Alternative Chinese name
- Simplified Chinese: 打箭炉
- Traditional Chinese: 打箭爐
- Postal: Tatsienlu
Transcriptions
Standard Mandarin
- Hanyu Pinyin: Dǎjiànlú

Tibetan name
- Tibetan: མདོ་ཁྲིན།
Transcriptions
- Wylie: mdo khrin
- Tibetan Pinyin: Dochin

Lucheng Subdistrict is one of two subdistricts of Kangding city in Garzê Tibetan Autonomous Prefecture in western Sichuan Province, China. Lucheng Subdistrict serves as the seat of the Kangding city government. As of 2010, the subdistrict has a population of 41,399 people.

== Administrative divisions ==
The subdistrict is divided into four neighborhood committees and ten village committees.

== Transport ==
- China National Highway 318

== See also ==
- List of township-level divisions of Sichuan
