= Nanwu Si Monastery =

Tibetan Buddhist monastery in Sichuan, China

Namosi Monastery
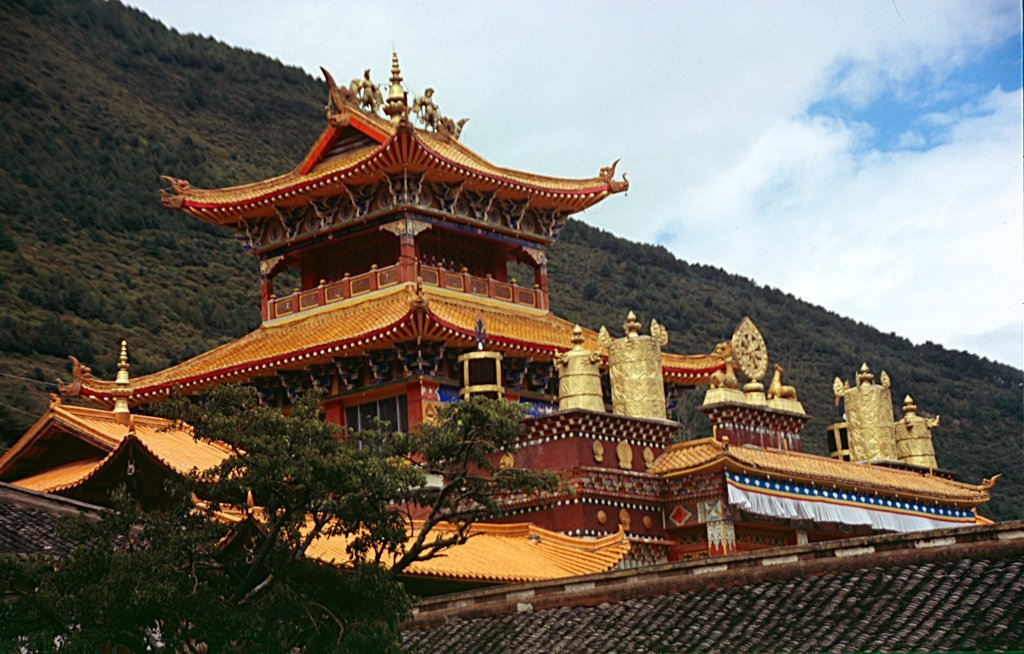
- Namosi Monastery

- Location within Sichuan

Religion
- Affiliation: Tibetan Buddhism

Location
- Location: Kangding, Kangding County, Garzê Tibetan Autonomous Prefecture, Sichuan Province, China
- Country: China
- Coordinates: 30°2′29″N 101°57′17″E

Namosi Monastery (Chinese: 南无寺; pinyin: Nāmó Sì; Tibetan: ལྷ་མོ་རྩེ་དགོན, Wylie: lha mo rtse dgon), also transliterated as Lhamotse Monastery, is a Tibetan Buddhist monastery west of the town of Kangding in Kangding County of the Garzê Tibetan Autonomous Prefecture, in Sichuan Province, southwestern China.

The complex of traditional architecture is located in the historical Tibetan region of Kham. The monastery is home to about 80 Buddhist monks.

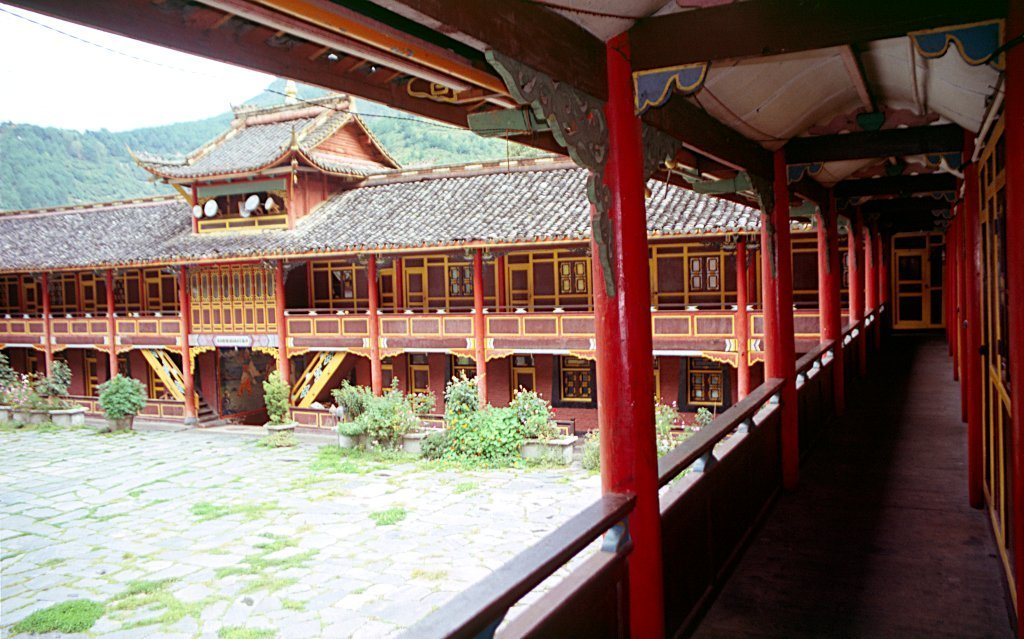

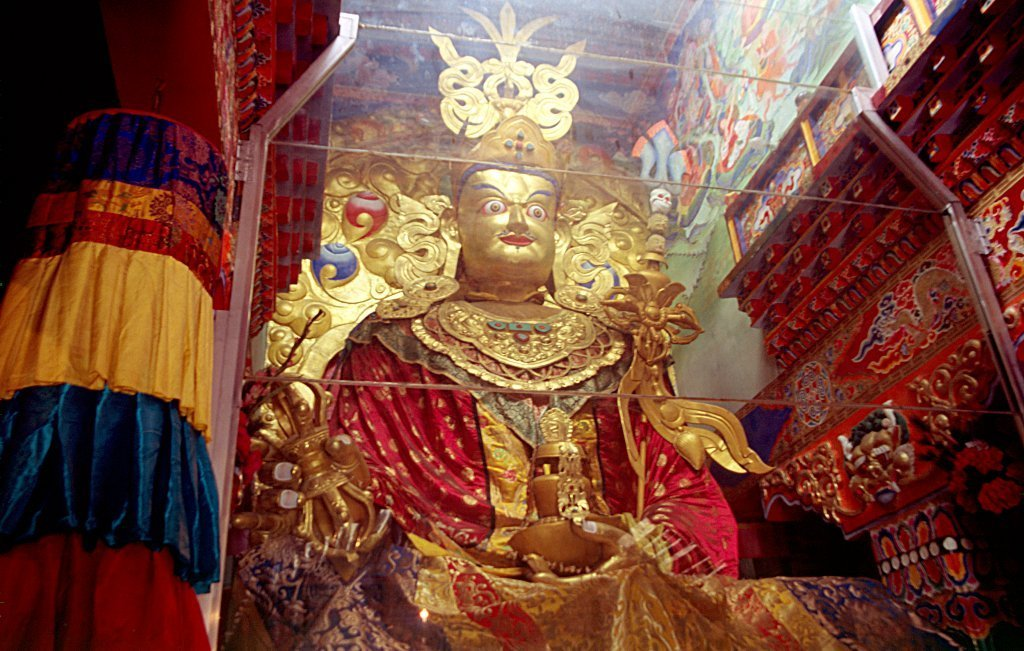

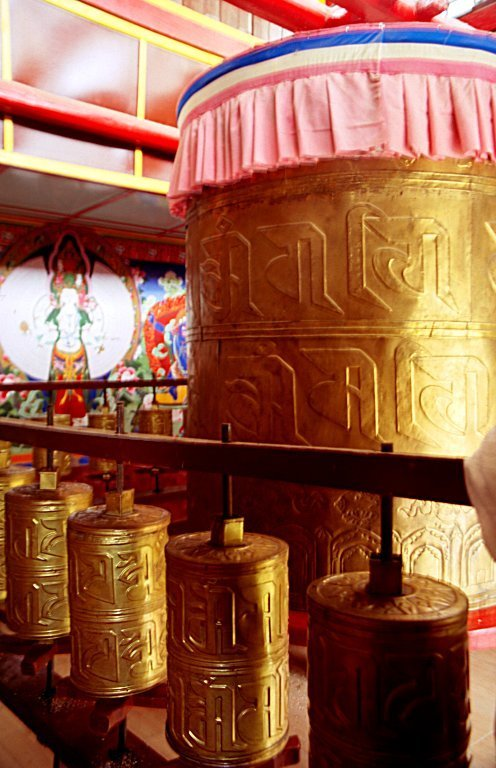

== See also ==
- Tibetan Buddhism
