= Jiju Township =

Jiju Township 吉居乡
- Township
- Location in Sichuan
- Coordinates: 29°20′45″N 101°04′03″E
- Country: People's Republic of China
- Province: Sichuan
- Autonomous prefecture: Garzê Tibetan Autonomous Prefecture
- County-level city: Kangding
- Time zone: UTC+8 (China Standard)

Jiju Township (simplified Chinese: 吉居乡; traditional Chinese: 吉居鄉; pinyin: Jíjū Xiāng) is a township under the administration of Kangding in western Sichuan, China.

As of 2020, it has five villages under its administration:

- Jiju Village
- Mati Village (马蹄村)
- Geba Village (各坝村)
- Songyu Village (宋玉村)
- Caiyu Village (菜玉村)
