= Tagong =

Tagong Lhagang
- Township

Tibetan transcription(s)
  - Tibetan: ལྷ་སྒང་
  - Wylie transliteration: lha sgang

Chinese transcription(s)
- Location within Sichuan
- Coordinates: 30°19′18″N 101°31′11″E
- Country: China
- Province: Sichuan
- Prefecture: Garzê Tibetan Autonomous Prefecture
- County: Kangding County
- Time zone: UTC+8 (CST)

Tagong (Chinese: 塔公), also known as Lhagang (Tibetan: ལྷ་སྒང་) is a small town in Garzê Tibetan Autonomous Prefecture of western Sichuan in southwestern China. It is located in the historical Kham region of eastern Tibet.

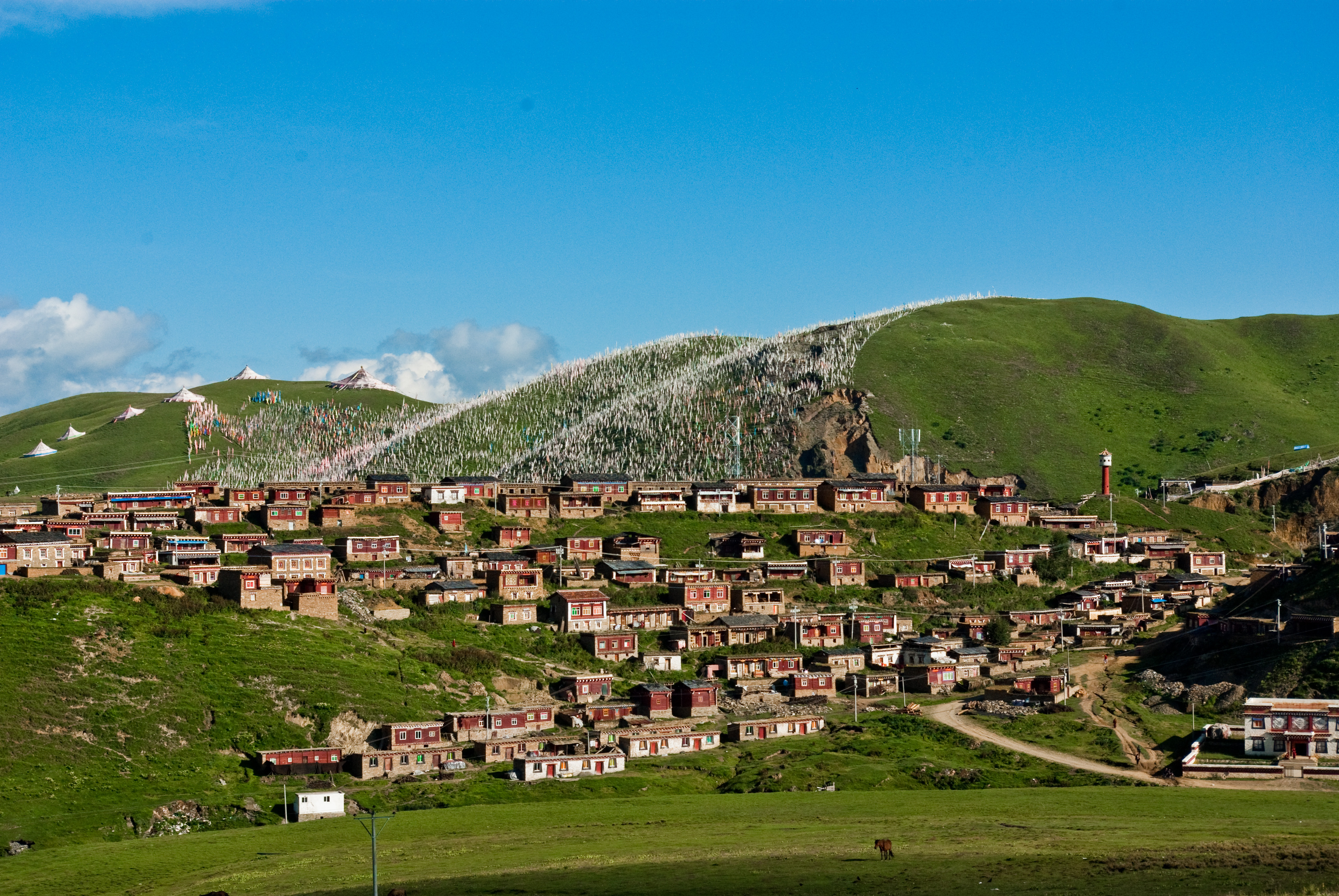
Tagong.

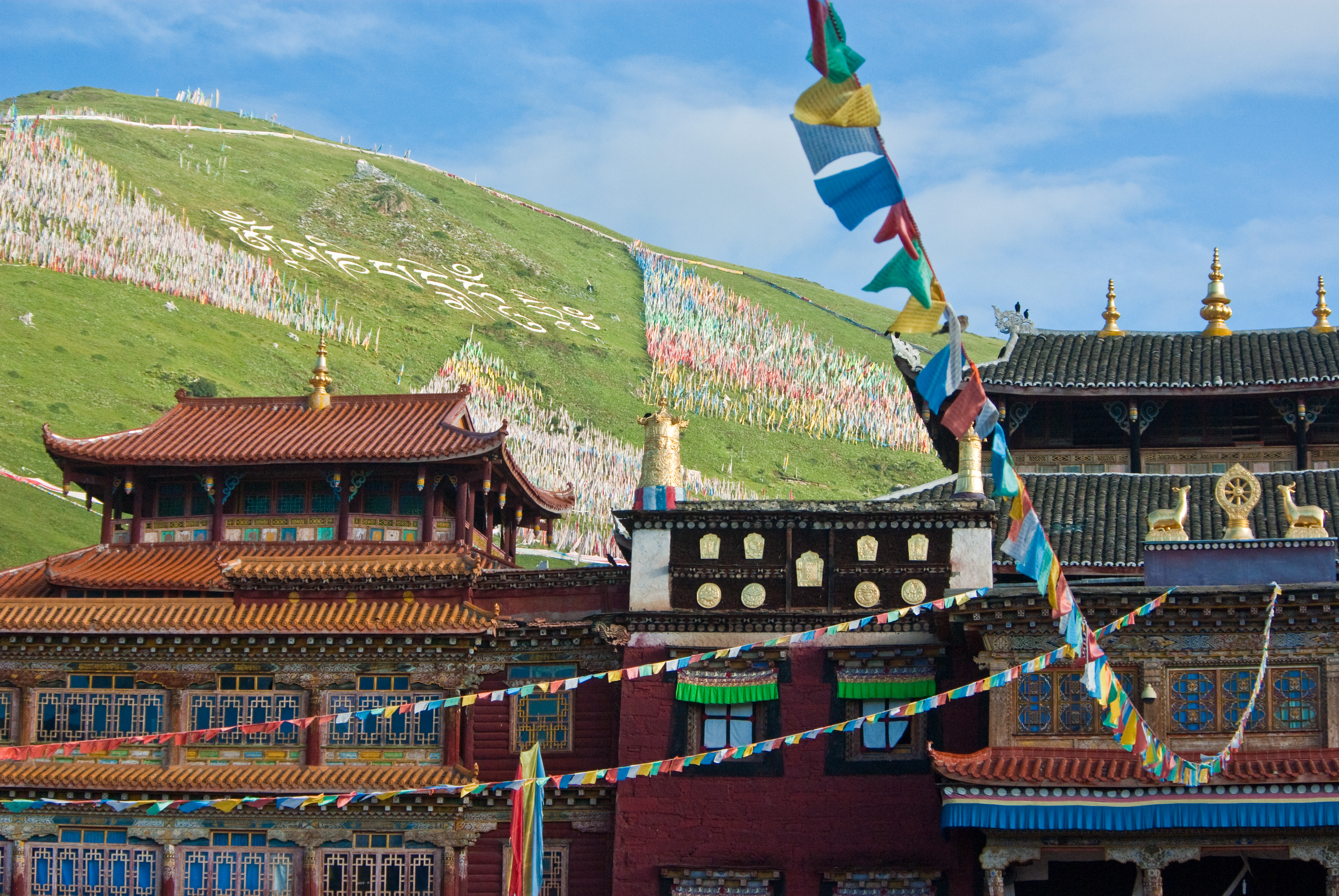
Tagong Monastery.

== Tagong Monastery ==
A gompa is where the Tagong Monastery is located. The gompa is one of the most important in the in Tibetan Pel Lhagong. The Tagong Monastery was established with reference to a nearby sacred mountain, Mt. Yala or Zhara Lhaste, which is 5,820 metres (19,090 ft) in elevation.

== Tagong Grassland ==
Tagong Grassland has an area of 712.37 square kilometres and located at 3900m in elevation.

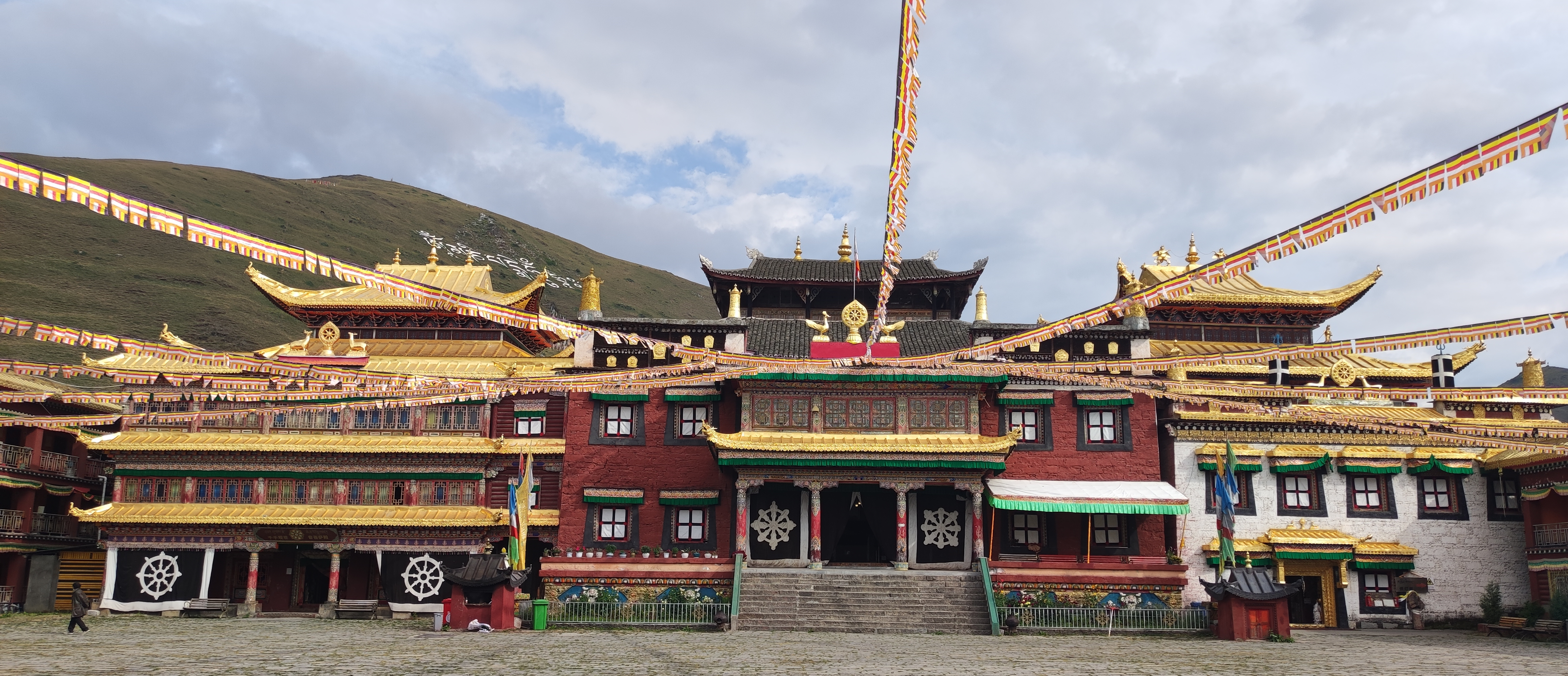
The Tagong monastery in August 2022

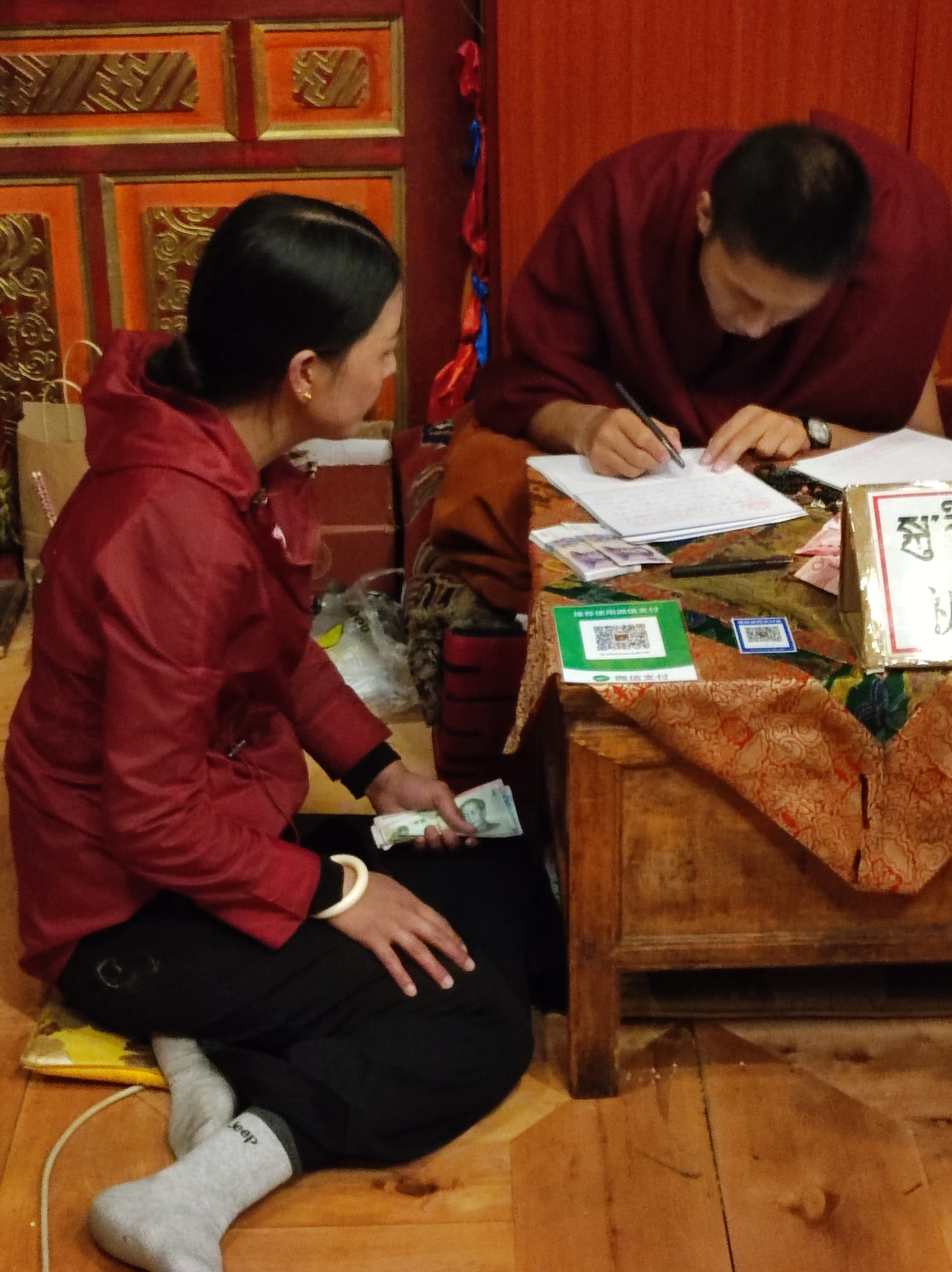
A monk receives donations from a visitor and writes blessings for her loved ones

== See also ==
- Tibetan Buddhism
- Media related to Tagong Monastery at Wikimedia Commons
