= Prince Henri of Orléans =

French prince and explorer

Prince Henri
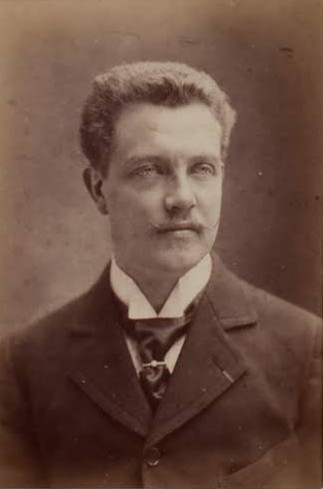
- Prince Henri, c. 1900
- Born: 16 October 1867; Ham, London, England
- Died: 9 August 1901 (aged 33); Saigon, Cochinchina
Names
- Henri Philippe Marie d'Orléans
- House: Orléans
- Father: Robert, Duke of Chartres
- Mother: Marie-Françoise of Orléans

Prince Henri of Orléans (16 October 1867 – 9 August 1901) was the son of Prince Robert, Duke of Chartres, and Princess Françoise of Orléans.

== Biography ==
Henri, the second eldest son and third child of Prince Robert, Duke of Chartres, was born at Ham, London on 16 October 1867.

In 1889, at the instance of his father, who paid the expenses of the tour, he undertook, in company with Gabriel Bonvalot and Father Constant de Deken (1852-1896), a journey through Siberia to French Indochina. In the course of their travels they crossed the mountain range of Tibet and the fruits of their observations, submitted to the Geographical Society of Paris (and later incorporated in De Paris au Tonkin à travers le Tibet inconnu, published in 1892), brought them conjointly the gold medal of that society.

In 1892 the prince made a short journey of exploration in East Africa, and shortly afterwards visited Madagascar, proceeding thence to Tongkin in present-day Vietnam. In April 1892 he visited Luang Prabang in Laos, leading him to write a letter to "Politique Coloniale" in January 1893. From this point he set out for Assam, and was successful in discovering the source of the Irrawaddy River, a brilliant geographical achievement which secured the medal of the Geographical Society of Paris and the Cross of the Legion of Honour. In 1897 he revisited Abyssinia, and political differences arising from this trip led to a duel with Vittorio Emanuele, Count of Turin.

While on a trip to Assam in 1901, he died at Saigon on 9 August, apparently due to "ill health".

Prince Henri was a somewhat violent Anglophobe, and his diatribes against Great Britain contrasted rather curiously with the cordial reception which his position as a traveller obtained for him in London, where he was given the gold medal of the Royal Geographical Society.

== Duel ==
In 1897, in several articles for Le Figaro, Prince Henri described the Italian soldiers being held captive in Ethiopia, during the first First Italo–Ethiopian War, as cowards. Prince Vittorio Emanuele thus challenged him to a duel. The sword was agreed upon as the weapon of choice, as the Italians thought that duel with pistols, favored by the French, was worthy of betrayed husbands, not of princes of royal blood.

The duel with swords, which lasted 26 minutes, took place at 5:00 am on 15 August 1897, in the Bois de Marechaux at Vaucresson, France. Vittorio Emanuele defeated Prince Henri after five reprises. The "Monseigneur" Henri received a serious wound to his right abdomen, and the doctors of both parties considered the injury serious enough to put him in a state of obvious inferiority, causing the end of the duel, and making the Count of Turin famous in Europe.

== In popular culture ==
=== Literature ===
- Race to Tibet by Sophie Schiller (2015) ISBN 978-0692254097
