= Silver battery =

Silver battery or silver electrochemical cell, may refer to:

- Silver-oxide battery (IEC code: S), nonrechargeable primary cells based on silver(I) oxide and zinc
- Silver zinc battery, rechargeable secondary cells based on silver(I,III) oxide and zinc
- Silver–calcium battery, rechargeable secondary cell lead-acid batteries based on lead–calcium–silver alloy
- Silver–cadmium battery, rechargeable secondary cells based on silver oxide and metallic cadmium
