= Ecoult =

Australian energy storage company

- Industry: Energy storage
- Founded: 2007
- Headquarters: Grafton Bond Building, 201 Kent Street, Sydney, Australia
- Area served: World ( Except Japan and Thailand )
- Key people: John Wood (CEO), Brian McKeon (CTO), Tze Masters (CFO)
- Parent: East Penn Manufacturing Inc.
- Website: www.ecoult.com

Ecoult was an energy storage company based out of Australia.

== Company history ==
Ecoult was originally formed in 2007 by the Australian Commonwealth Scientific and Industrial Research Organisation (CSIRO). CSIRO invented the UltraBattery, a hybrid ultracapacitor and lead-acid battery technology, and formed a subsidiary company, Ecoult, to commercialize the technology.

In May 2010, East Penn Manufacturing acquired Ecoult from CSIRO, along with the global license to manufacture the UltraBattery (outside Japan and Thailand where Furukawa Battery holds the head license).

Ecoult was named in the Cleantech Group's 2013 Global Cleantech 100 in 2013.

In July 2020, East Penn Manufacturing announced that it was winding down its investment in Ecoult. In January 2021 the ecoult.com website announced that Ecoult has ceased operations.
