= Lemon battery =

Simple battery made with a lemon for educational purposes

Diagram showing three lemon cells wired together so that they energize the red light-emitting diode (LED) at the top. Each individual lemon has a zinc electrode and a copper electrode inserted into it; the zinc is colored gray in the diagram. The slender lines drawn between the electrodes and the LED represent the wires.

A lemon battery is a simple battery often made for the purpose of education. Typically, a piece of zinc metal (such as a galvanized nail) and a piece of copper (such as a penny) are inserted into a lemon and connected by wires. Power generated by reaction of the metals is used to power a small device such as a light-emitting diode (LED).

The lemon battery is similar to the first electrical battery invented in 1800 by Alessandro Volta, who used brine (salt water) instead of lemon juice. The lemon battery illustrates the type of chemical reaction (oxidation-reduction) that occurs in batteries. The zinc and copper are the electrodes, and the juice inside the lemon is the electrolyte. There are many variations of the lemon cell that use different fruits (or liquids) as electrolytes and metals other than zinc and copper as electrodes.

== Use in school projects ==
There are numerous sets of instructions for making lemon batteries and for obtaining components such as light-emitting diodes, (LEDs), electrical meters (multimeters), and zinc-coated (galvanized) nails and screws. Commercial "potato clock" science kits include electrodes and a low-voltage digital clock. After one cell is assembled, a multimeter can be used to measure the voltage or the electric current from the voltaic cell; a typical voltage is 0.9 V with lemons. Currents are more variable, but range up to about 1 mA (the larger the electrode surfaces, the bigger the current). For a more visible effect, lemon cells can be connected in series to power an LED (see illustration) or other devices. The series connection increases the voltage available to devices. Swartling and Morgan have published a list of low-voltage devices along with the corresponding number of lemon cells that were needed to power them; they included LEDs, piezoelectric buzzers, and small digital clocks. With the zinc/copper electrodes, at least two lemon cells were needed for any of these devices. Substituting a magnesium electrode for the zinc electrode makes a cell with a larger voltage (1.5−1.6 V), and a single magnesium/copper cell will power some devices. Note that incandescent light bulbs from flashlights are not used because the lemon battery is not designed to produce enough electric current to light them. Such a battery typically produces 0.001 A (1 mA) of current at a potential difference of 0.7 V; these values are multiplied together to determine the overall power of 0.0007 W (0.7 mW).

=== Variations ===
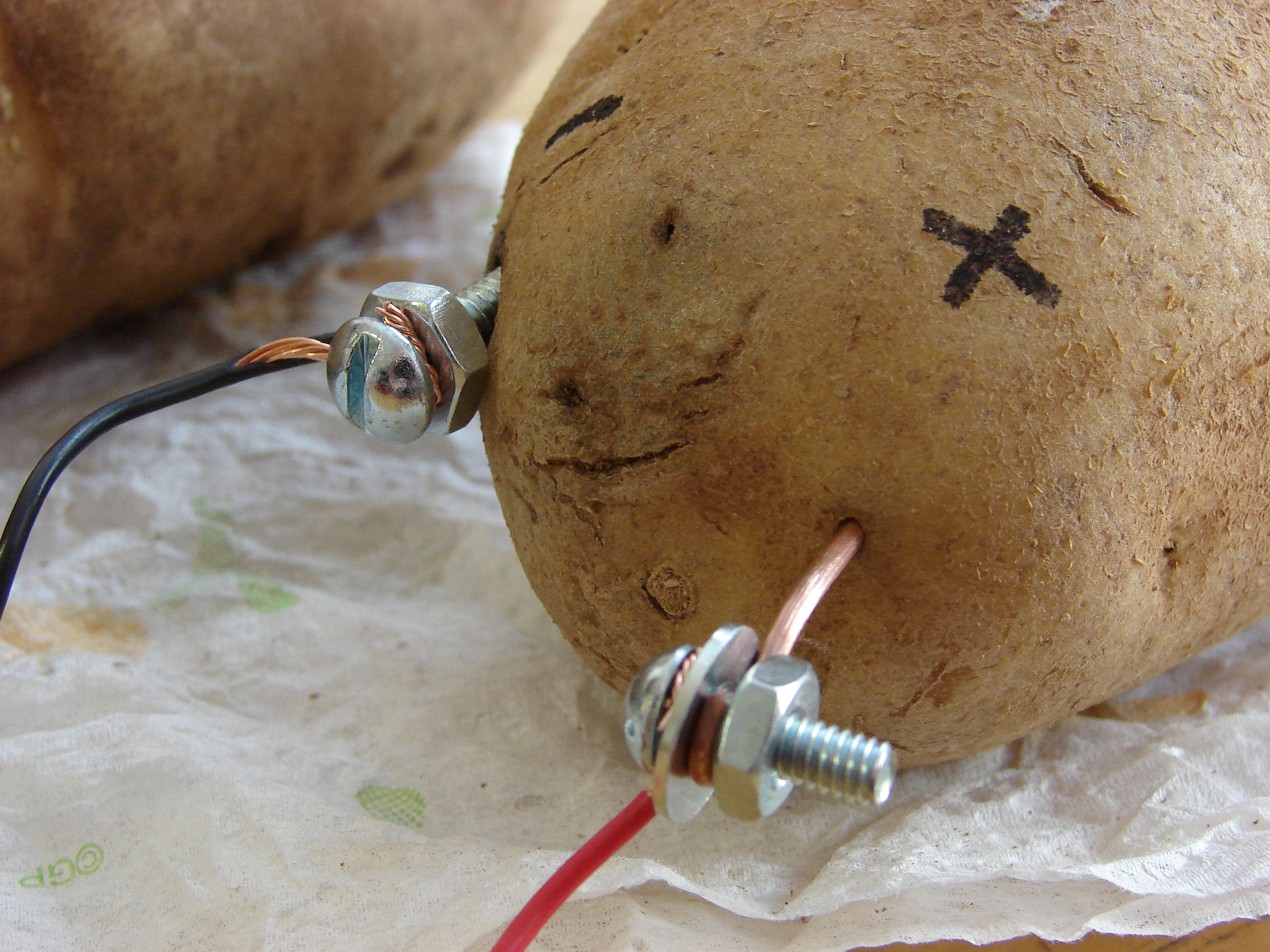
Potato battery with zinc (left) and copper electrodes. The zinc electrode is a galvanized machine screw. The copper electrode is a wire. Note the labels − and + marked on the potato indicating that the copper electrode is the positive terminal of the battery. A short screw and nut connect the electrodes to the copper wires that have black and red insulating plastic coatings.

Many fruits and liquids can be used for the acidic electrolyte. Fruit is convenient, because it provides both the electrolyte and a simple way to support the electrodes. The acid involved in citrus fruits (lemons, oranges, grapefruits, etc.) is citric acid. The acidity, which is indicated by the measured pH, varies substantially.

Potatoes have phosphoric acid and work well; they are the basis for commercial "potato clock" kits. Potato batteries with LED lighting have been proposed for use in poor countries or by off-grid populations. International research begun in 2010 showed that boiling potatoes for eight minutes improves their electrical output, as does placing slices of potatoes between multiple copper and zinc plates. Boiled and chopped plantain pith (stem) is also suitable, according to Sri Lankan researchers.

Instead of fruit, liquids in various containers can be used. Household vinegar (containing acetic acid) works well. Sauerkraut (containing lactic acid) was featured in one episode of the US television program Head Rush (an offshoot of the MythBusters program). The sauerkraut had been canned, and became the electrolyte while the can itself was one of the electrodes.

Zinc and copper electrodes are reasonably safe and easy to obtain. Other metals such as lead, iron, magnesium, etc., can be studied as well; they yield different voltages than the zinc/copper pair. In particular, magnesium/copper electrodes can generate voltages as large as 1.6 V in lemon cells. This voltage is larger than obtainable using zinc/copper cells. It is comparable to that of standard household batteries (1.5 V), which is useful in powering devices with a single cell instead of using cells in series.

=== Learning outcomes ===
For the youngest pupils, about ages 5–9, the educational goal is utilitarian: batteries are devices that can power other devices, as long as they are connected by a conductive material. Batteries are components in electrical circuits; hooking a single wire between a battery and a light bulb will not power the bulb.

For children in the age range 10−13, batteries are used to illustrate the connection between chemistry and electricity as well as to deepen the circuit concept for electricity. The fact that different chemical elements such as copper and zinc are used can be placed in the larger context that the elements do not disappear or break down when they undergo chemical reactions.

For older pupils and for college students, batteries serve to illustrate the principles of oxidation-reduction reactions. Students can discover that two identical electrodes yield no voltage and that different pairs of metals (beyond copper and zinc) yield different voltages. The voltages and currents from series and parallel combinations of the batteries can be examined.

The current that is output by the battery through a meter will depend on the size of the electrodes, how far the electrodes are inserted into the fruit, and how close to each other the electrodes are placed; the voltage is fairly independent of these details of the electrodes.

== Chemistry ==
Cross-section of a copper/zinc cell with a sulfuric acid electrolyte. The drawing illustrates the atomic model for the chemical reactions; lemon cells have essentially the same model. Zinc atoms enter the electrolyte as ions missing two electrons (Zn^{2+}). Two negatively charged electrons from the dissolved zinc atom are left in the zinc metal. Two of the dissolved protons (H^{+}) in the acidic electrolyte combine with each other and two electrons to form molecular hydrogen H_{2}, which bubbles off of the copper electrode. The electrons lost from the copper are made up by moving two electrons from the zinc through the external wire.

Most textbooks present the following model for the chemical reactions of a lemon battery. When the cell is providing an electric current through an external circuit, the metallic zinc at the surface of the zinc electrode is dissolving into the solution. Zinc atoms dissolve into the liquid electrolyte as electrically charged ions (Zn^{2+}), leaving 2 negatively charged electrons (e^{−}) behind in the metal:

Zn → Zn^{2+} + 2e^{−} .

This reaction is called oxidation. While zinc is entering the electrolyte, two positively charged hydrogen ions (H^{+}) from the electrolyte combine with two electrons at the copper electrode's surface and form an uncharged hydrogen molecule (H_{2}):

2H^{+}+ 2e^{−} → H_{2} .

This reaction is called reduction. The electrons used in the copper to form the molecules of hydrogen are transferred from the zinc through an external wire connecting between the copper and the zinc. The hydrogen molecules formed on the surface of the copper by the reduction reaction will ultimately bubble away as hydrogen gas.

== Experiment results ==
This model of the chemical reactions makes several predictions that were examined in experiments published by Jerry Goodisman in 2001. Goodisman notes that numerous recent authors propose chemical reactions for the lemon battery that involve dissolution of the copper electrode into the electrolyte. Goodisman excludes this reaction as being inconsistent with the experiments, and notes that the correct chemistry, which involves the evolution of hydrogen at the copper electrode but also can use silver instead of copper, has been known for many years. Most of the detailed predictions of the model apply to the battery's voltage that is measured directly by a meter at open circuit (nothing else is connected to the battery). When the electrolyte was modified by adding zinc sulfate (ZnSO_{4}), the voltage from the cell was reduced as predicted using the Nernst equation for the model. The Nernst equation essentially says how much the voltage drops as more zinc sulfate is added. The addition of copper sulfate (CuSO_{4}) did not affect the voltage. This result is consistent with the fact that copper atoms from the electrode are not involved in the chemical reaction model for the cell.

When the battery is hooked up to an external circuit and a significant electric current is flowing, the zinc electrode loses mass, as predicted by the zinc oxidation reaction above. Similarly, hydrogen gas evolves as bubbles from the copper electrode. Finally, the voltage from the cell depended upon the acidity of the electrolyte, as measured by its pH; decreasing acidity (and increasing pH) causes the voltage to fall. This effect is also predicted by the Nernst equation; the particular acid that was used (citric, hydrochloric, sulfuric, etc.) does not affect the voltage except through the pH value.

The Nernst equation prediction failed for strongly acid electrolytes (pH < 3.4), when the zinc electrode dissolves into the electrolyte even when the battery is not providing any current to a circuit. The two oxidation-reduction reactions listed above only occur when electrical charge can be transported through the external circuit. The additional, open-circuit reaction can be observed by the formation of bubbles at the zinc electrode under open-circuit. This effect ultimately limited the voltage of the cells to 1.0 V near room temperature at the highest levels of acidity.

=== Energy source ===
The energy comes from the chemical change in the zinc when it dissolves into the acid. The energy does not come from the lemon or potato. The zinc is oxidized inside the lemon, exchanging some of its electrons with the acid in order to reach a lower energy state, and the energy released provides the power.

In current practice, zinc is produced by electrowinning of zinc sulfate or pyrometallurgical reduction of zinc with carbon, which requires an energy input. The energy produced in the lemon battery comes from reversing this reaction, recovering some of the energy input during the zinc production.

=== Smee cell ===
From 1840 to the late 19th century, large, voltaic cells using a zinc electrode and a sulfuric acid electrolyte were widely used in the printing industry. While copper electrodes like those in lemon batteries were sometimes used, in 1840 Alfred Smee invented a refined version of this cell that used silver with a rough platinum coating instead of a copper electrode. Hydrogen gas clinging to the surface of a silver or copper electrode reduces the electric current that can be drawn from a cell; the phenomenon is called "polarization". The roughened, "platinized" surface speeds up the bubbling of the hydrogen gas, and increases the current from the cell. Unlike the zinc electrode, the copper or platinized silver electrodes are not consumed by using the battery, and the details of this electrode do not affect the cell's voltage. The Smee cell was convenient for electrotyping, which produced copper plates for letterpress printing of newspapers and books, and also statues and other metallic objects.

The Smee cell used amalgamated zinc instead of pure zinc; the surface of amalgamated zinc has been treated with mercury. Apparently amalgamated zinc was less prone to degradation by an acidic solution than is pure zinc. Amalgamated zinc and plain zinc electrodes give essentially the same voltage when the zinc is pure. With the imperfectly refined zinc in 19th century laboratories they typically gave different voltages.

== See also ==
- List of battery types
- Alessandro Volta
- Electrochemical cell
- Galvanic cell
- Galvanic corrosion
- Lasagna cell
- Penny battery
