= List of battery types =

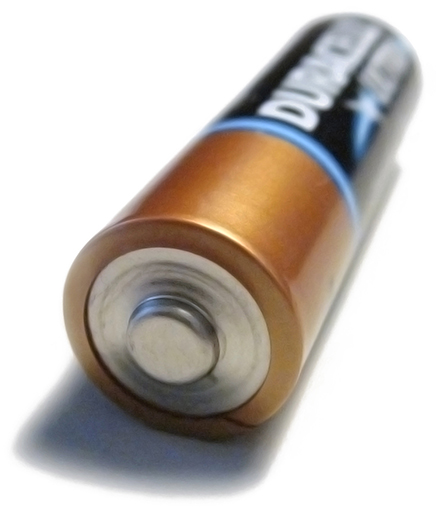
A Duracell AA size alkaline cell, one of the many types of battery

This is a summary of electric battery types composed of one or more electrochemical cells. There are two lists provided in the table. The primary (non-rechargeable) and secondary (rechargeable) cell lists are lists of battery chemistry. The third list is a list of battery applications.

== Battery cell types ==
Primary cells or non-rechargeable batteries	Secondary cells or rechargeable batteries	
Alkaline battery; Aluminium–air battery; Bunsen cell; Chromic acid cell (Poggendorff cell); Clark cell; Daniell cell; Dry cell; Earth battery; Frog battery; Galvanic cell; Grove cell; Leclanché cell; Lemon/potato battery; Lithium metal battery; Lithium–air battery; Magnesium battery; Mercury battery; Molten salt battery; Nickel oxyhydroxide battery; Oxyride battery; Organic radical battery; Paper battery; Pulvermacher's chain; Smee cell; Silver-oxide battery; Solid-state battery; Sugar battery; Voltaic pile; Penny battery; Trough battery; Water-activated battery; Weston cell; Zinc–air battery; Zinc–carbon battery; Zinc–chloride battery; Zamboni pile	Aluminium-ion battery; Calcium battery; Flow battery; Iron redox flow battery; Vanadium redox battery; Zinc–bromine battery; Zinc–cerium battery; Hydrogen–bromine battery; Glass battery; Lead–acid battery; Deep-cycle battery; Flooded battery; VRLA battery; AGM battery; Gel battery; UltraBattery; Lithium-ion battery; Lithium-ion lithium cobalt oxide battery (ICR); Lithium–silicon battery; Lithium-ion manganese iron phosphate battery; Lithium-ion manganese-oxide battery (LMO); Lithium-ion polymer battery (LiPo); Lithium–iron–phosphate battery (LFP); Lithium–nickel–manganese–cobalt oxides (NMC); Lithium–nickel–cobalt–aluminium oxides (NCA); Lithium–sulfur battery; Lithium–titanate battery (LTO); Thin-film lithium-ion battery; Lithium–ceramic battery; Magnesium-ion battery	Metal–air electrochemical cells; Lithium–air battery; Germanium–air battery; Calcium–air battery; Iron–air battery; Potassium-ion battery; Silicon–air battery; Zinc–air battery; Tin–air battery; Sodium–air battery; Beryllium–air battery; Microbial fuel cell; Molten-salt battery; Nickel–cadmium battery; Nickel–cadmium battery vented cell type; Nickel–hydrogen battery; Nickel–iron battery (NiFe battery); Nickel–lithium battery; Nickel–metal hydride battery; Low self-discharge NiMH battery; Nickel–zinc battery; Organic radical battery; Oxygen-ion battery; Polymer-based battery; Polysulfide–bromide battery; Rechargeable alkaline battery; Rechargeable fuel battery; Rechargeable lithium–metal battery; Sand battery; Silver–zinc battery; Silver–calcium battery; Silver–cadmium battery; Sodium-ion battery; Sodium–sulfur battery; Solid-state battery; Super iron battery; Wet cell; Zinc ion battery

== Batteries by application ==
- Automotive battery
- Backup battery
- Battery (vacuum tube)
- Battery pack
- Battery room
- Battery-storage power station
- Biobattery
- Button cell
- CMOS battery
- Common battery
- Commodity cell
- Electric-vehicle battery
- Flow battery
- Home energy storage
- Inverter battery
- Lantern battery
- Nanobatteries
- Nanowire battery
- Local battery
- Polapulse battery, in the Polaroid SX-70
- Photoflash battery
- Reserve battery
- Smart battery system
- Watch battery
- Water-activated battery

== See also ==
- Atomic battery
- Baghdad Battery
- Battery nomenclature
- Capacitor
- Carnot battery
- Comparison of commercial battery types
- History of the battery
- List of battery sizes
- List of energy densities
- Search for the Super Battery (2017 PBS film)
- Fuel cell
