= Backup battery =

Battery used when the primary power source is unavailable

A backup battery provides power to a system when the primary source of power is unavailable. Backup batteries range from small single cells to retain clock time and date in computers, up to large battery room facilities that power uninterruptible power supply systems for large data centers. Small backup batteries may be primary cells; rechargeable backup batteries are kept charged by the prime power supply.

== Examples ==
=== Aircraft emergency batteries ===
Backup batteries in aircraft keep essential instruments and devices running in the event of an engine power failure. Each aircraft has enough power in the backup batteries to facilitate a safe landing. The batteries keeping navigation, ELUs (emergency lighting units), emergency pressure or oxygen systems running at altitude, and radio equipment operational. Larger aircraft have control surfaces that run on these backups as well. Aircraft batteries are either nickel-cadmium or valve-regulated lead acid type. The battery keeps all necessary items running for between 30 minutes and 3 hours. Large aircraft may have a ram air turbine to provide additional power during engine failures.

=== Burglar alarms ===
Backup batteries are almost always used in burglar alarms. The backup battery prevents the burglar from disabling the alarm by turning off power to the building. Additionally these batteries power the remote cellular phone systems that thwart phone line snipping as well. The backup battery usually has a lifespan of 3-10 years depending on the make and model, and so if the battery runs flat, there is only one main source of power to the whole system which is the mains power. Should this fail as well (for example, a power cut), it usually triggers a third backup battery located in the bellboxes on the outside of the building which simply triggers the bell or siren. This however means that the alarm cannot be stopped in any way apart from physically going outside to the bellbox and disabling the siren. It is also why if there is a power outage in the area, most burglar alarms do start ringing and cannot be realistically stopped until the main power is restored.

=== Computers ===
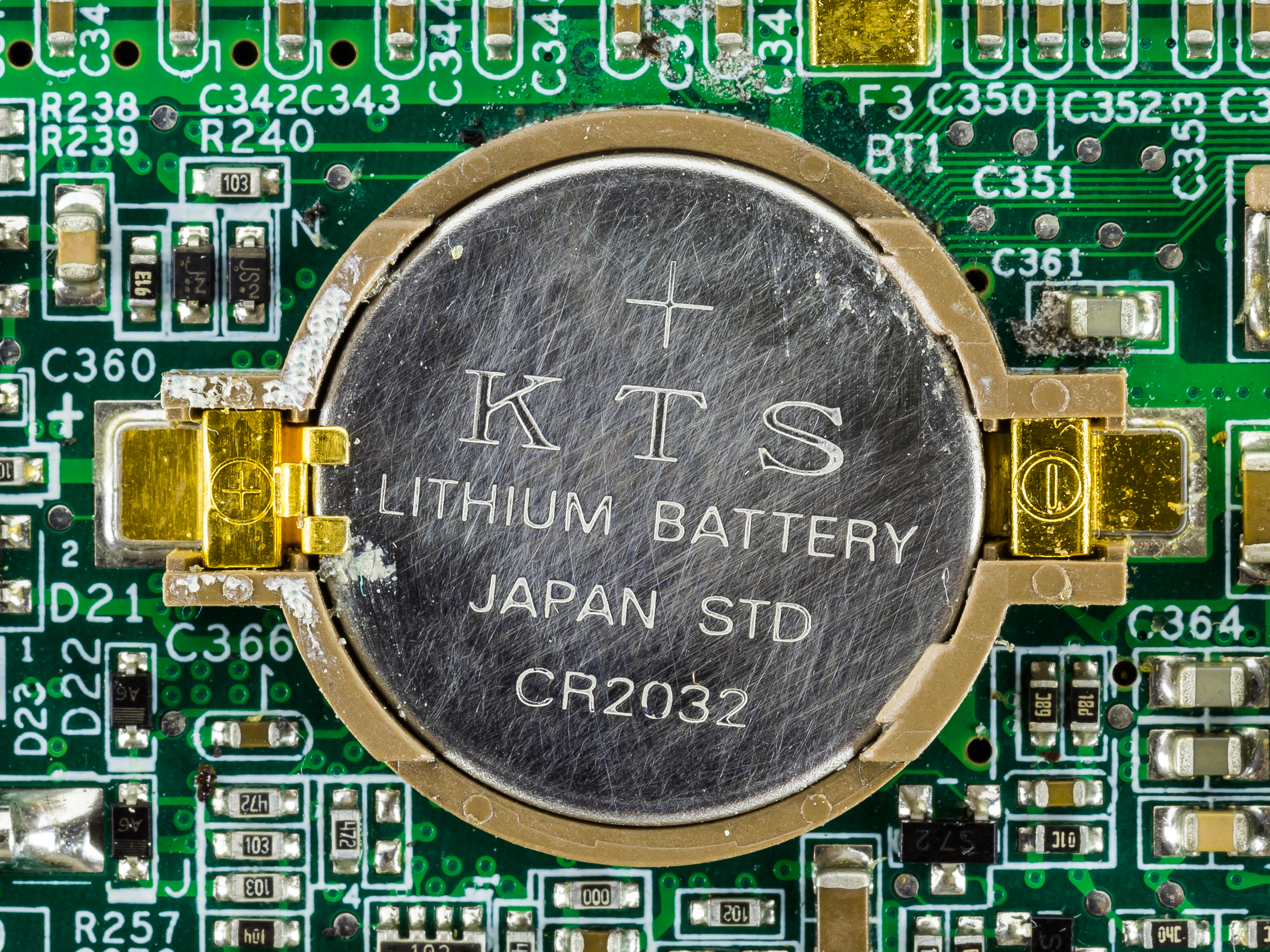
CR2032 battery used as backup battery on a notebook motherboard

Modern personal computer motherboards have a backup battery to run the real-time clock circuit and retain configuration memory while the system is turned off. This is often called the CMOS battery or BIOS battery. The original IBM AT through to the PS/2 range, used a relatively large primary lithium battery, compared to later models, to retain the clock and configuration memory. These early machines required the backup battery to be replaced periodically due to the relatively large power consumption. Some manufacturers of clone machines used a rechargeable battery to avoid the problems that could be created by a failing battery. Modern systems use a coin style primary battery. In these later machines, the current draw is almost negligible and the primary batteries usually outlast the system that they support. It is rare to find rechargeable batteries in such systems.

Backup batteries are used in uninterruptible power supplies (UPS), and provide power to the computers they supply for a variable period after a power failure, usually long enough to at least allow the computer to be shut down gracefully. These batteries are often large valve regulated lead-acid batteries in smaller or portable systems. Data center UPS backup batteries may be wet cell lead-acid or nickel cadmium batteries, with lithium ion cells available in some ratings.

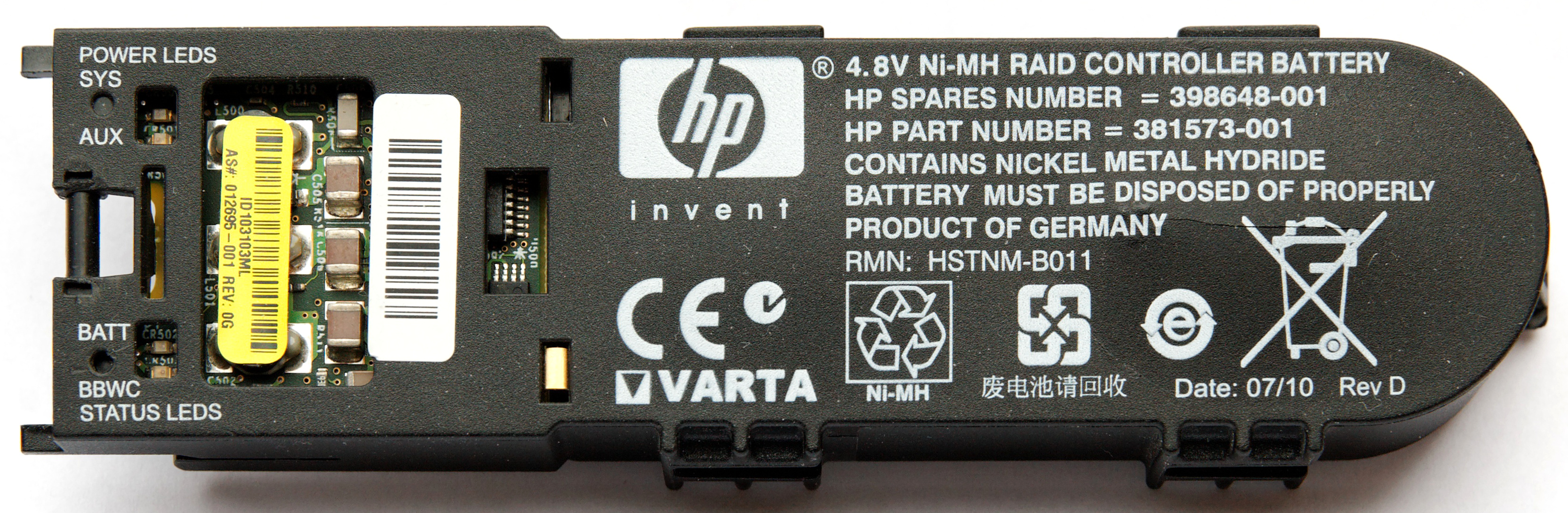
Battery module of a Hewlett-Packard RAID controller

Server-grade disk array controllers often contain onboard disk buffer, and provide an option for a "backup battery unit" (BBU) to maintain the contents of this cache after power loss. If this battery is present, disk writes can be considered completed when they reach the cache, thus speeding up I/O throughput by not waiting for the hard drive. This operation mode is called "write-back caching".

=== Telephony ===
A local backup battery unit is necessary in some telephony and combined telephony/data applications built with use of digital passive optical networks. In such networks there are active units on telephone exchange side and on the user side, but nodes between them are all passive in the meaning of electrical power usage. So, if a building (such as an apartment house) loses power, the network continues to function. The user side must have standby power since operating power isn't transferred over data optical line.

=== Telecommunications networks and data centers ===
A valve-regulated lead-acid battery (VRLA) is a battery type that is popular in telecommunications network environments as a reliable backup power source. VRLA batteries are used in the outside plant at locations such as Controlled Environmental Vaults (CEVs), Electronic Equipment Enclosures (EEEs), and huts, and in uncontrolled structures such as cabinets. VRLA Battery String Certification Levels Based on Requirements for Safety and Performance, is a new industry-approved set of VRLA requirements that provides a three-level compliance system. The compliance system provides a common framework for evaluating and qualifying various valve-regulated lead-acid battery technologies. The framework intends to alleviate the complexities associated with product introduction and qualification. For a VRLA, the quality system employed by the manufacturer is an important key to the overall reliability of it. The manufacturing processes, test and inspection procedures, and quality program used by a manufacturer should be adequate to ensure that the final product meets the needs of the end user, the application, and industry-accepted standards and processes (i.e., ANSI/IEC, TL9000, and Generic Requirements for the Physical Design and Manufacture of Telecommunications Products and Equipment.

=== Video game cartridges ===
Cartridge-based video games sometimes contain a battery which is used to preserve the contents of a small RAM chip on which saved games and/or high scores are recorded.

=== Hospitals ===
Power failure in a hospital would result in life-threatening conditions for patients. Patients undergoing surgery or on life support are reliant on a consistent power supply. Backup generators or batteries supply power to critical equipment until main power can be restored.

=== Power Stations ===
Power failure in a power station that produces electricity would result in a blackout situation that would cause irreparable damage to equipment such as the turbine-generator. The safety of power station employees is a major concern during an unscheduled power outage at a power plant. A bank of large station backup batteries are used to power uninterruptible power supplies as well as directly power emergency oil pumps for up to 8 hours while normal power is being restored to the power station.

Tesla, Inc installed the world's largest lithium ion battery pack for the government of South Australia in 2017; to help alleviate energy (electricity) blackouts in the state. Tesla met the guarantee by Elon Musk of installation in 100 days or it would be free.

== See also ==
- List of battery types
- Reserve battery
