= Michael Aziz =

American research scientist

Michael J. Aziz
- Education: California Institute of Technology (BS); Harvard University (PhD)
- Known for: Organic battery
- Awards: 2016 Bruce Chalmers Award from The Minerals, Metals & Materials Society; 2019 Energy Frontiers Prize, ENI award
- Scientific career
- Fields: Applied Physics, Materials Science, Energy science and technology
- Workplaces: Harvard University
- Thesis: Kinetics of crystallization of B_{2}O_{3} under pressure and theory of motion of the crystal-melt interface at wide departures from equilibrium (1983)
- Doctoral advisor: David Turnbull
- Website: aziz.seas.harvard.edu

Michael John Aziz is an American research scientist and engineer and the Gene and Tracy Sykes Professor of Materials and Energy Technologies at the Harvard John A. Paulson School of Engineering and Applied Sciences. He is an affiliated faculty member of the Harvard University Center for the Environment, for which he served from 2009 to 2018 as the faculty coordinator for the Graduate Consortium for Energy and Environment. He is also Chief Scientist and a co-founder of Quino Energy, Inc.

== Early life ==
Aziz had received his B.S. from the California Institute of Technology in 1978 and then got his Ph.D. in applied physics from Harvard University in 1983 while working under the direction of David Turnbull. As a postdoc, he had spent two years at the Oak Ridge National Laboratory where he was a Eugene P. Wigner Postdoctoral Fellow. Since 1986 he has been a faculty member on what is now the Harvard John A. Paulson School of Engineering and Applied Sciences and he is currently the Gene and Tracy Sykes Professor of Materials and Energy Technologies.

== Research ==
Starting in 2012, Aziz has worked with Alán Aspuru-Guzik, Roy Gordon and the United States Department of Energy to develop aqueous-soluble organic flow batteries for grid-scale electrical energy storage. In 2016 he used vitamin B2 to improve the work of an organic battery. The battery was later named Organic Mega Flow Battery. This research resulted in patents issued by the United States Patent and Trademark Office.

== Quino Energy ==
Quino is developing a non-corrosive water-based quinones flow battery. The company received a Department of Energy (DOE) grant in 2021 for $4.58 million followed by a $2.6 million grant in 2024. In 2025 Quino received a $10 million grant from the California Energy Commission as well as a $5 million DOE grant. The company claimed that its battery provided 8-24 hours of storage.

== Awards ==
- 1993 Fellow of the American Physical Society
- 2004 Fellow of the American Association for the Advancement of Science
- 2010 Materials Research Society fellow
- 2016 Bruce Chalmers Award from The Minerals, Metals & Materials Society
- 2019 Energy Frontiers Prize, ENI award
