= LMFP battery =

Type of battery

A lithium manganese iron phosphate (LMFP) battery is a lithium-iron phosphate battery (LFP) that includes manganese as a cathode component. As of 2026, the first LMFP batteries for commercial use are beginning to become available. Vendors claim that LMFP batteries can be competitive in cost with LFP, while achieving superior performance.

== Specificity ==
The Chinese battery company Gotion claims to have achieved a gravimetric energy density of 240 Wh/kg, a volume energy density of 525 Wh/l, and a duration of 1800-4000 cycles. Weight energy density at the pack level is 190 Wh/kg.

== History ==
In 2014, BYD Auto announced its intentions to offer LMFP batteries in its vehicles in 2015. As of 2026, the batteries have been released under the Blade Battery 2.0 branding and are featured in many 2026 vehicles.

In 2022, Gotion reached agreement with the US state of Michigan on a package of incentives for building a large battery factory in the northern part of the state, despite some local opposition.

Contemporary Amperex Technology (CATL) with its M3P battery announced plans to ship batteries in 2023, while BYD, Sunwoda, and Eve Energy are also commercializing LMFP batteries.

== Challenges ==
Commercializing the technology involved reducing manganese dissolution at high temperatures, increasing conductivity and compaction density, granulation technology, and electrolyte additives are all challenges faced by LMFP batteries.

== See also ==
- List of battery types
- List of battery sizes
- List of electric-vehicle-battery manufacturers
- Comparison of commercial battery types
- Nanowire battery
- Phosphate
- Power-to-weight ratio
- Solid-state battery
- Super-iron battery
- Blade battery
