= Polymer-based battery =

Type of battery

A polymer-based battery uses organic materials instead of bulk metals to form a battery. Currently accepted metal-based batteries pose many challenges due to limited resources, negative environmental impact, and the approaching limit of progress. Redox active polymers are attractive options for electrodes in batteries due to their synthetic availability, high-capacity, flexibility, light weight, low cost, and low toxicity. Recent studies have explored how to increase efficiency and reduce challenges to push polymeric active materials further towards practicality in batteries. Many types of polymers are being explored, including conductive, non-conductive, and radical polymers. Batteries with a combination of electrodes (one metal electrode and one polymeric electrode) are easier to test and compare to current metal-based batteries, however batteries with both a polymer cathode and anode are also a current research focus. Polymer-based batteries, including metal/polymer electrode combinations, should be distinguished from metal-polymer batteries, such as a lithium polymer battery, which most often involve a polymeric electrolyte, as opposed to polymeric active materials.

Organic polymers can be processed at relatively low temperatures, lowering costs. They also produce less carbon dioxide.

== History ==
Organic batteries are an alternative to the metal reaction battery technologies, and much research is taking place in this area.

An article titled "Plastic-Metal Batteries: New promise for the electric car" wrote in 1982: "Two different organic polymers are being investigated for possible use in batteries" and indicated that the demo he gave was based on work begun in 1976.

Waseda University was approached by NEC in 2001, and began to focus on the organic batteries. In 2002, NEC researcher presented a paper on Piperidinoxyl Polymer technology, and by 2005 they presented an organic radical battery (ORB) based on a modified PTMA, poly(2,2,6,6-tetramethylpiperidinyloxy-4-yl meth-acrylate).

In 2006, Brown University announced a technology based on polypyrrole. In 2007, Waseda announced a new ORB technology based on "soluble polymer, polynorborene with pendant nitroxide radical groups."

In 2015 researchers developed an efficient, conductive, electron-transporting polymer. The discovery employed a "conjugated redox polymer" design with a naphthalene-bithiophene polymer that has been used for transistors and solar cells. Doped with lithium ions it offered significant electronic conductivity and remained stable through 3,000 charge/discharge cycles. Polymers that conduct holes have been available for some time. The polymer exhibits the greatest power density for an organic material under practical measurement conditions. A battery could be 80% charged within 6 seconds. Energy density remained lower than inorganic batteries.

== Electrochemistry ==
Like metal-based batteries, the reaction in a polymer-based battery is between a positive and a negative electrode with different redox potentials. An electrolyte transports charges between these electrodes. For a substance to be a suitable battery active material, it must be able to participate in a chemically and thermodynamically reversible redox reaction. Unlike metal-based batteries, whose redox process is based on the valence charge of the metals, the redox process of polymer-based batteries is based on a change of state of charge in the organic material. For a high energy density, the electrodes should have similar specific energies.

=== Classification of active materials ===
The active organic material could be a p-type, n-type, or b-type. During charging, p-type materials are oxidized and produce cations, while n-types are reduced and produce anions. B-type organics could be either oxidized or reduced during charging or discharging.

== Charge and discharge ==
In a commercially available Li-ion battery, the Li+ ions are diffused slowly due to the required intercalation and can generate heat during charge or discharge. Polymer-based batteries, however, have a more efficient charge/discharge process, resulting in improved theoretical rate performance and increased cyclability.

=== Charge ===
To charge a polymer-based battery, a current is applied to oxidize the positive electrode and reduce the negative electrode. The electrolyte salt compensates the charges formed. The limiting factors upon charging a polymer-based battery differ from metal-based batteries and include the full oxidation of the cathode organic, full reduction of the anode organic, or consumption of the electrolyte.

=== Discharge ===
Upon discharge, the electrons go from the anode to cathode externally, while the electrolyte carries the released ions from the polymer. This process, and therefore the rate performance, is limited by the electrolyte ion travel and the electron-transfer rate constant, k_{0}, of the reaction.

This electron transfer rate constant provides a benefit of polymer-based batteries, which typically have high values on the order of 10^{−1} cm s^{−1}. The organic polymer electrodes are amorphous and swollen, which allows for a higher rate of ionic diffusion and further contributes to a better rate performance. Different polymer reactions, however, have different reaction rates. While a nitroxyl radical has a high reaction rate, organodisulfades have significantly lower rates because bonds are broken and new bonds are formed.

Batteries are commonly evaluated by their theoretical capacity (the total capacity of the battery if 100% of active material were utilized in the reaction). This value can be calculated as follows:

$C_t (mA\ h\ g^{-1})=\frac{mnF}{M}$

where m is the total mass of active material, n is the number of transferred electrons per molar mass of active material, M is the molar mass of active material, and F is Faraday's constant.

=== Charge and discharge testing ===
Most polymer electrodes are tested in a metal-organic battery for ease of comparison to metal-based batteries. In this testing setup, the metal acts as the anode and either n- or p-type polymer electrodes can be used as the cathode. When testing the n-type organic, this metal-polymer battery is charged upon assembly and the n-type material is reduced during discharge, while the metal is oxidized. For p-type organics in a metal-polymer test, the battery is already discharged upon assembly. During initial charging, electrolyte salt cations are reduced and mobilized to the polymeric anode while the organic is oxidized. During discharging, the polymer is reduced while the metal is oxidized to its cation.

== Types of active materials ==
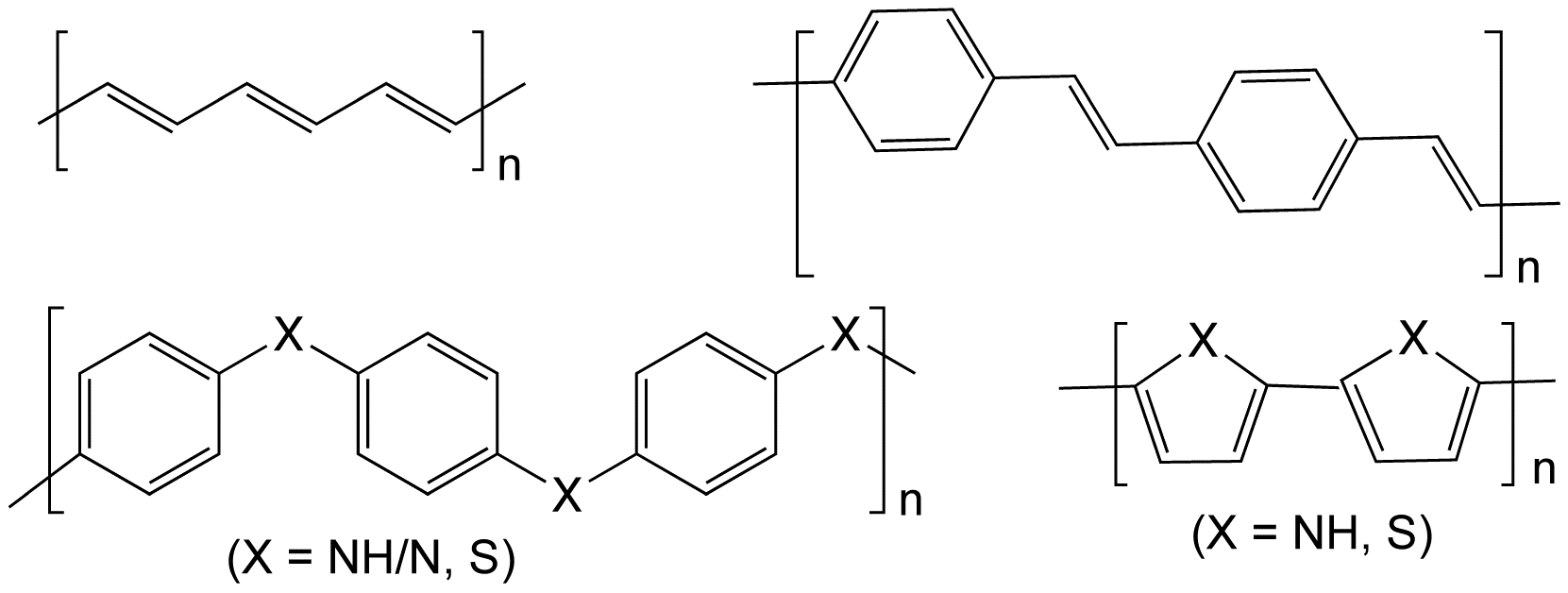
Structures of various conductive polymers. In these polymers, the redox group is embedded into the backbone.

=== Conductive polymers ===
Conductive polymers can be n-doped or p-doped to form an electrochemically active material with conductivity due to dopant ions on a conjugated polymer backbone. Conductive polymers (i.e. conjugated polymers) are embedded with the redox active group, as opposed to having pendant groups, with the exception of sulfur conductive polymers. They are ideal electrode materials due to their conductivity and redox activity, therefore not requiring large quantities of inactive conductive fillers. However they also tend to have low coulombic efficiency and exhibit poor cyclability and self-discharge. Due to the poor electronic separation of the polymer's charged centers, the redox potentials of conjugated polymers change upon charge and discharge due to a dependence on the dopant levels. As a result of this complication, the discharge profile (cell voltage vs. capacity) of conductive polymer batteries has a sloped curve.

Conductive polymers struggle with stability due to high levels of charge, failing to reach the ideal of one charge per monomer unit of polymer. Stabilizing additives can be incorporated, but these decrease the specific capacity.

=== Non-conjugated polymers with pendant groups ===
Despite the conductivity advantage of conjugated polymers, their many drawbacks as active materials have furthered the exploration of polymers with redox active pendant groups. Groups frequently explored include carbonyls, carbazoles, organosulfur compounds, viologen, and other redox-active molecules with high reactivity and stable voltage upon charge and discharge. These polymers present an advantage over conjugated polymers due to their localized redox sites and more constant redox potential over charge/discharge.

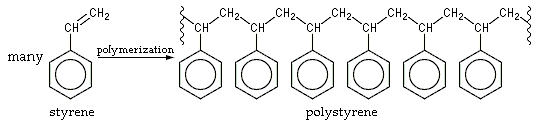
In a polystyrene chain, the phenyl groups are the pendant groups attached to the polymer's backbone chain.

==== Carbonyl pendant groups ====
Carbonyl compounds have been heavily studied, and thus present an advantage, as new active materials with carbonyl pendant groups can be achieved by many different synthetic properties. Polymers with carbonyl groups can form multivalent anions. Stabilization depends on the substituents; vicinal carbonyls are stabilized by enolate formation, aromatic carbonyls are stabilized by delocalization of charge, and quinoidal carbonyls are stabilized by aromaticity.

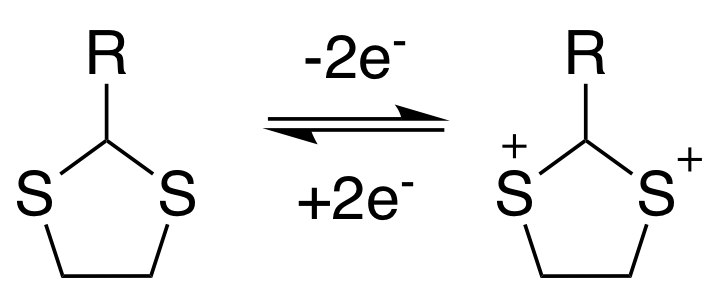
Charge/discharge redox reaction of thioether pendant group.

==== Organosulfur groups ====
Sulfur is one of earth's most abundant elements and thus are advantageous for active electrode materials. Small molecule organosulfur active materials exhibit poor stability, which is partially resolved via incorporation into a polymer. In disulfide polymers, electrochemical charge is stored in a thiolate anion, formed by a reversible two-electron oxidation of the disulfide bond. Electrochemical storage in thioethers is achieved by the two-electron oxidation of a neutral thioether to a thioether with a +2 charge. As active materials, however, organosulfur compounds, however, exhibit weak cyclability.

==== Radical groups ====
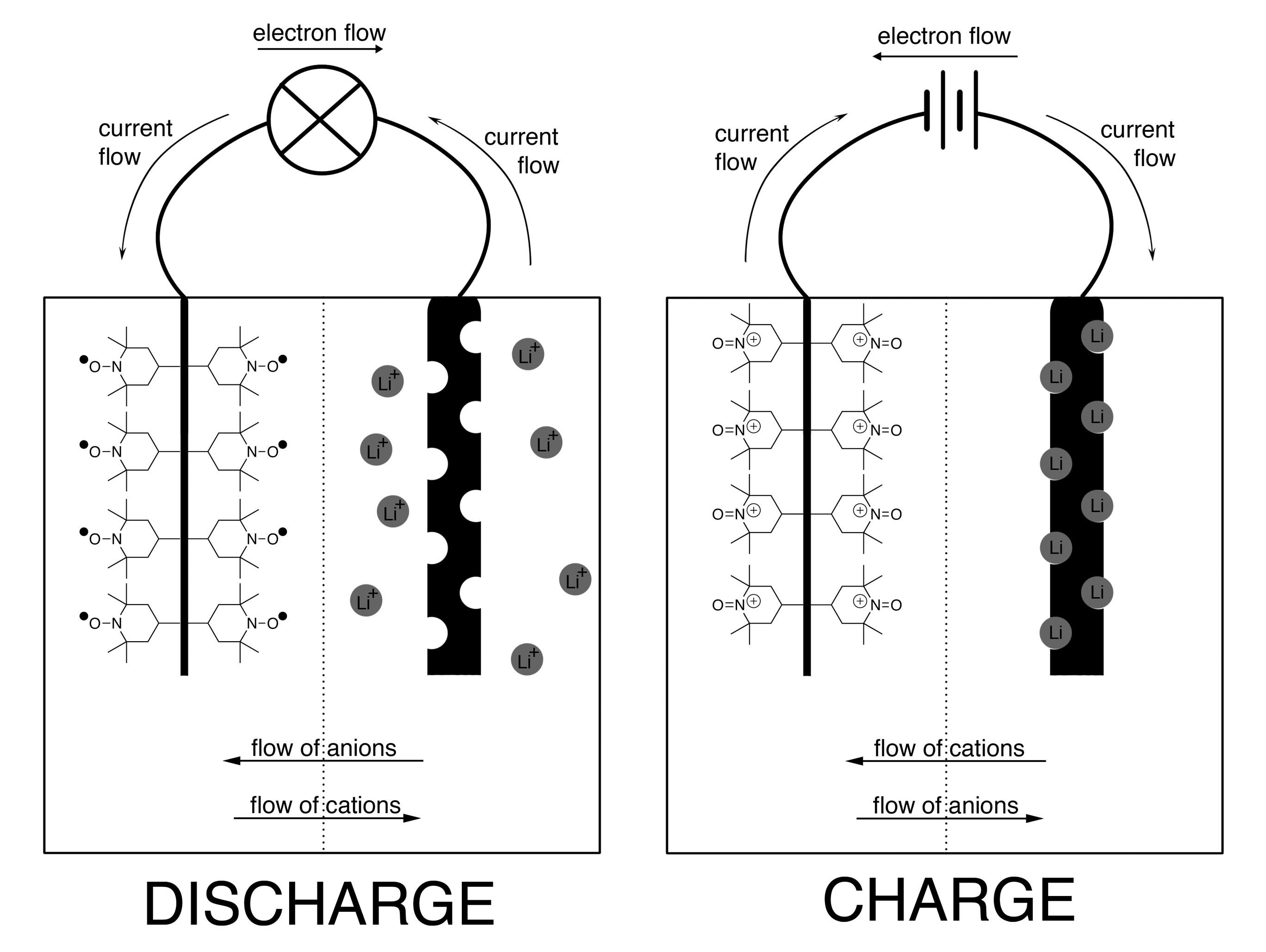
Charge and discharge of a Li/radical polymer battery, consisting of a Li anode and nitroxide radical group polymer. This is an example of a semi polymer based battery, where only one electrode is polymeric.

Polymeric electrodes in organic radical batteries are electrochemically active with stable organic radical pendant groups that have an unpaired electron in the uncharged state. Nitroxide radicals are the most commonly applied, though phenoxyl and hydrazyl groups are also often used. A nitroxide radical could be reversibly oxidized and the polymer p-doped, or reduced, causing n-doping. Upon charging, the radical is oxidized to an oxoammonium cation, and at the cathode, the radical is reduced to an aminoxyl anion. These processes are reversed upon discharge, and the radicals are regenerated. For stable charge and discharge, both the radical and doped form of the radical must be chemically stable. These batteries exhibit excellent cyclability and power density, attributed to the stability of the radical and the simple one-electron transfer reaction. Slight decrease in capacity after repeated cycling is likely due to a build up of swollen polymer particles which increase the resistance of the electrode. Because the radical polymers are considerably insulating, conductive additives are often added that which lower the theoretical specific capacity. Nearly all organic radical batteries feature a nearly constant voltage during discharge, which is an advantage over conductive polymer batteries. The polymer backbone and cross-linking techniques can be tuned to minimize the solubility of the polymer in the electrolyte, thereby minimizing self-discharge.

== Control and performance ==
=== Performance summary comparison of key polymer electrode types ===
Polymer type	electrode material (electrolyte doping species)	Initial Reversible Capacity (mAh g^{−1})	Working Voltage	Cyclability (mAh g^{−1})
conjugated	PANI (CLO_{4}^{−} and Li^{+})	75.7	3.90-2.0	75.7 after 80 cycles
	PPy (SO_{4}^{2-})	52.2		
	PPP (PF_{6}^{−} and Li^{+})	80 (p-doping) 400 (n-doping)	4.6-3.0 3.0-0.0	70 after 100 cycles 580 after 90 cycles
organosulfide	PDMcT^{4}	240	3.8-1.8	10 after 10 cycles
thioether	PTBDT^{5}	240	4.2-1.4	560 after 20 cycles
nitroxyl radical	PTMA (Li^{+} and PF_{6}^{−})	77	4.0-3.0	68 after 500 cycles

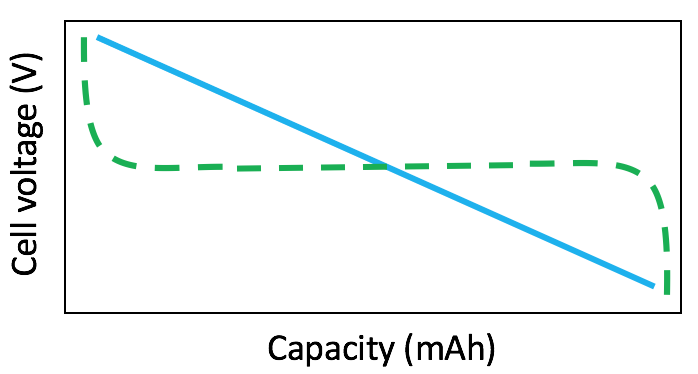
This graph is a schematic representation of the problematic sloping discharge curve (blue) of a conductive polymer battery, compared to the voltage plateau of a non-conjugated or organic radical polymer batter discharge curve (green).

During discharge, conductive polymers have a sloping voltage that hinders their practical applications. This sloping curve indicates electrochemical instability which could be due to morphology, size, the charge repulsions within the polymer chain during the reaction, or the amorphous state of polymers.

=== Effect of polymer morphology ===
Electrochemical performance of polymer electrodes is affected by polymer size, morphology, and degree of crystallinity. In a polypyrrole (PPy)/Sodium ion hybrid battery, a 2018 study demonstrated that the polymer anode with a fluffy structure consisting of chains of submicron particles performed with a much higher capacity (183 mAh g^{−1}) as compared to bulk PPy (34.8 mAh g^{−1}). The structure of the submicron polypyrrole anode allowed for increased electrical contact between the particles, and the electrolyte was able to further penetrate the polymeric active material. It has also been reported that amorphous polymeric active materials performs better than the crystalline counterpart. In 2014, it was demonstrated that crystalline oligopyrene exhibited a discharge capacity of 42.5 mAh g^{−1}, while the amorphous oligopyrene has a higher capacity of 120 mAh g^{−1}. Further, the crystalline version experienced a sloped charge and discharge voltage and considerable overpotential due to slow diffusion of ClO_{4}^{−}. The amorphous oligopyrene had a voltage plateau during charge and discharge, as well as significantly less overpotential.

=== Molecular weight control ===
The molecular weight of polymers effects their chemical and physical properties, and thus the performance of a polymer electrode. A 2017 study evaluated the effect of molecular weight on electrochemical properties of poly(TEMPO methacrylate) (PTMA). By increasing the monomer to initiator ratio from 50/1 to 1000/1, five different sizes were achieved from 66 to 704 degrees of polymerization. A strong dependence on molecular weight was established, as the higher the molecular weight polymers exhibited a higher specific discharge capacity and better cyclability. This effect was attributed to a reciprocal relationship between molecular weight and solubility in the electrolyte.

== Advantages ==
Polymer-based batteries have many advantages over metal-based batteries. The electrochemical reactions involved are more simple, and the structural diversity of polymers and method of polymer synthesis allows for increased tunability for desired applications. While new types of inorganic materials are difficult to find, new organic polymers can be much more easily synthesized. Another advantage is that polymer electrode materials may have lower redox potentials, but they have a higher energy density than inorganic materials. And, because the redox reaction kinetics for organics is higher than that for inorganics, they have a higher power density and rate performance. Because of the inherent flexibility and light weight of organic materials as compared to inorganic materials, polymeric electrodes can be printed, cast, and vapor deposited, enabling application in thinner and more flexible devices. Further, most polymers can be synthesized at low cost or extracted from biomass and even recycled, while inorganic metals are limited in availability and can be harmful to the environment.

Organic small molecules also possess many of these advantages, however they are more susceptible to dissolving in the electrolyte. Polymeric organic active materials less easily dissolve and thus exhibit superior cyclability.

== Challenges ==
Though superior in this sense to small organic molecules, polymers still exhibit solubility in electrolytes, and battery stability is threatened by dissolved active material that can travel between electrodes, leading to decreased cyclability and self-discharge, which indicates weaker mechanical capacity. This issue can be lessened by incorporating the redox-active unit in the polymeric backbone, but this can decrease the theoretical specific capacity and increase electrochemical polarization. Another challenge is that besides conductive polymers, most polymeric electrodes are electrically insulating and therefore require conductive additives, reducing the battery's overall capacity. While polymers do have a low mass density, they have a greater volumetric energy density which in turn would require an increase in volume of devices being powered.

== Safety ==
A 2009 study evaluated the safety of a hydrophilic radical polymer and found that a radical polymer battery with an aqueous electrolyte is nontoxic, chemically stable, and non-explosive, and is thus a safer alternative to traditional metal-based batteries. Aqueous electrolytes present a safer option over organic electrolytes which can be toxic and can form HF acid. The one-electron redox reaction of a radical polymer electrode during charging generates little heat and therefore has a reduced risk of thermal runaway. Further studies are required to fully understand the safety of all polymeric electrodes.

== See also ==
- List of battery types
