= Reserve battery =

Primary battery kept in an inactive state for future use

A reserve battery, also called stand-by battery, is a primary battery where part is isolated until the battery needs to be used. When long storage is required, reserve batteries are often used, since the active chemicals of the cell are segregated until needed, thus reducing self-discharge.

A reserve battery is distinguished from a backup battery, in that a reserve battery is inert until it is activated, while a backup battery is already functional, even if it is not delivering current.

Reserve batteries are mostly used in missiles projection, bomb fuzes and various other weapon systems.

== Uses ==
These batteries are used in radiosondes, missiles, projectile and bomb fuzes, and various weapon systems.

While not advertised as reserve batteries, the principle is illustrated by the sale of "dry charged" car batteries where the electrolyte is added at the time of sale. Another example is zinc-air batteries where the cell is sealed until use: a tab is removed to admit air and activate the cell.

== Activation ==
Reserve batteries may be activated by addition of water, by adding electrolyte, by introducing a gas into the cell that is either the active cathode material or part of the electrolyte, or by heating a solid electrolyte to a temperature at which it becomes conductive. The missing element of the battery can be added before use in several ways. The battery can have water or electrolyte added manually, the battery can be activated when the system is dropped into the water (such as in a sonobuoy), or electrolyte can be stored in a capsule within the battery and released by mechanical means, an electrical trigger, or by spin or shock. A molten-electrolyte battery is activated by igniting a pyrotechnic heat source. The battery delivers current for a short time (seconds to a few minutes), but some thermal batteries can be stored ten years or more without deterioration. Reserve batteries remain uncommon in civilian applications because of their higher cost and relatively short life after activation.

In missiles, reserve batteries typically use a small container of pressurized air to force the electrolyte from a storage tank into the battery. For safe disposal, the air must be vented.

In ordnance, the batteries are activated by acceleration during gun firing, or by spinning the projectile in flight.

== Types ==
Some reserve batteries are:

- Aluminium battery, a variant of zinc-air battery where aluminium and air are used
- Silver-zinc battery, often found in old missiles
- Thermal battery, a class of battery types with molten salt as an electrolyte. The battery is in an inert state until the electrolyte melts through heating. Common in military applications, especially for missiles and proximity fuzes. Examples include V-2 rockets, AIM-9 Sidewinder, MIM-104 Patriot, BGM-71 TOW, BGM-109 Tomahawk, many nuclear weapons, and other single-use applications.
- Water-activated battery, a class of batteries where the electrolyte is water that has to be added, such as HydroPak or NoPoPo.

== See also ==
- List of battery types
