= Commodity cell =

Type of battery

A commodity cell is a type of battery made in large volumes for use by original equipment manufacturers. For example, commodity cells are used in laptops and cell phones, as the energy storage element in its batteries.

== Production ==
The auto industry battery consortium, USABC, set about to invent automotive batteries made from specialty cells for cars.

Tesla Motors uses commodity cells to make its automotive batteries.

Practically all commodity cells today are made in Asia – mainly Japan, South Korea, and China. There is no significant production anywhere in the US. Modern lithium ion cell plants – such as those in Japan – are a highly automated affair with very low labor content.

== See also ==
- List of battery types
