= Alán Aspuru-Guzik =

Mexican-American chemist (born 1976)

- Born: July 4, 1976 (age 50); United States
- Citizenship: Mexico, United States
- Education: University of California, Berkeley; National Autonomous University of Mexico
- Known for: Variational quantum eigensolver, Self-driving Labs
- Scientific career
- Fields: Quantum chemistry Quantum computing
- Workplaces: University of Toronto; Harvard University
- Thesis: Solving Schroedinger's equation using random walks (2004)
- Doctoral advisor: William A. Lester Jr.
- Other academic advisors: Martin Head-Gordon
- Website: matter.toronto.edu

Alán Aspuru-Guzik is a professor of chemistry, computer science, chemical engineering and materials science at the University of Toronto Faculty of Arts and Science. He is also Senior Director of Quantum Chemistry, NVIDIA. His research group, the matter lab, studies quantum chemistry, AI for chemical and materials discovery, quantum computing and self-driving chemical. He is the co-founder of Kebotix, a company focused on automated chemical and material discovery. He previously cofounded Zapata Computing, which temporarily closed in 2024, and has since undergone restructuring and emerged as Zapata Quantum.

== Early life ==
Aspuru-Guzik was raised in Mexico City, Mexico. When he was in junior high, he represented Mexico at the International Chemistry Olympiad, after which his passion for science, particularly chemistry, grew.

Aspuru-Guzik had obtained his Bachelor of Science degree in chemistry from the National Autonomous University of Mexico in 1999. In 2004, he was awarded a Ph.D. in physical chemistry from the University of California, Berkeley. He continued at Berkeley as a postdoctoral fellow between 2005 and 2006, working with Martin Head-Gordon.

== Career ==
From 2006 to 2010, Aspuru-Guzik was an assistant professor at Harvard University, before becoming associate professor in 2010, and professor in 2013. In 2018, Professor Aspuru-Guzik moved to the University of Toronto as a Canada 150 Research Chair.

From 2012 to 2014, Aspuru-Guzik had worked with Michael Aziz and Roy Gordon with funding from the United States Department of Energy to develop grid-scale, metal-free flow batteries. In 2016, Aspuru-Guzik had worked with Ryan Babbush, a quantum engineer at Google to develop a new algorithm for a quantum computer which will be able to detect various molecules, such as cholesterol. Generalizing such research efforts, he has substantially contributed to developing ideas of hybrid quantum classical algorithms.

== Business endeavors and Zapata Computing closure ==
Aspuru-Guzik co-founded Zapata Computing, a company initially positioned as a pioneer in quantum computing solutions for various industries. The company aimed to leverage quantum machine learning to accelerate the discovery of new materials and optimize complex tasks, such as predicting car race outcomes and enhancing aerodynamic design for energy efficiency in sectors like aviation and automotive. In 2023, Zapata Computing went public via a special-purpose acquisition company (SPAC) merger, listing on Nasdaq. In October 2024, Zapata announced it would cease operations. In September 2025, Zapata returned as Zapata Quantum after a strategic restructuring, with a renewed focus on hardware-agnostic quantum software.

== Selected publications ==
- Duvenaud, David K; Maclaurin, Dougal; Iparraguirre, Jorge; Bombarell, Rafael; Hirzel, Timothy; Aspuru-Guzik, Alan; Adams, Ryan P (2015). "Convolutional Networks on Graphs for Learning Molecular Fingerprints". Advances in Neural Information Processing Systems. 28. Curran Associates, Inc. arXiv:1509.09292.
- Peruzzo, Alberto; McClean, Jarrod; Shadbolt, Peter; Yung, Man-Hong; Zhou, Xiao-Qi; Love, Peter J.; Aspuru-Guzik, Alán; O'Brien, Jeremy L. (July 23, 2014). "A variational eigenvalue solver on a photonic quantum processor". Nature Communications. 5 (1): 4213. arXiv:1304.3061. Bibcode:2014NatCo...5.4213P. doi:10.1038/ncomms5213. ISSN 2041-1723. PMC 4124861. PMID 25055053.
- Gómez-Bombarelli, Rafael; Wei, Jennifer N.; Duvenaud, David; Hernández-Lobato, José Miguel; Sánchez-Lengeling, Benjamín; Sheberla, Dennis; Aguilera-Iparraguirre, Jorge; Hirzel, Timothy D.; Adams, Ryan P.; Aspuru-Guzik, Alán (February 28, 2018). "Automatic Chemical Design Using a Data-Driven Continuous Representation of Molecules". ACS Central Science. 4 (2): 268–276. doi:10.1021/acscentsci.7b00572. ISSN 2374-7943. PMC 5833007. PMID 29532027.

== Honors and awards ==
- 2011 Big Think Delphi Fellow
- 2012 Elected Fellow of the American Physical Society
- 2015 Senior Fellow of the Canadian Institute for Advanced Research (CIFAR)
- 2017 Elected Fellow of the American Association for the Advancement of Science (AAAS)
- 2013 Computer World Data+ Award
- 2023 John C. Polanyi Award, Chemical Institute of Canada
- 2025 Fellow of the Royal Society of Canada
