= Rechargeable fuel battery =

Rechargeable fuel batteries are a new type of rechargeable battery that researchers have developed which uses electrodes in liquid form. This type of battery can either be recharged or the liquid electrodes can be replaced.

These batteries could allow electric cars to travel 500 miles before recharging. Replacing the liquid electrodes could only take a few minutes while recharging batteries takes much longer. These batteries don't have the problems of short circuits and overheating. The downsides are that nanoparticles degrade quickly, the technology is new and needs more development, they need to focus on cheaper production, and refilling stations would cost a lot to build.

== See also ==
- List of battery types
- Comparison of battery types
- Flow battery
