= Super-iron battery =

The Super-iron battery is a moniker for a proposed class of rechargeable electric battery. Such batteries feature cathodes composed of ferrate salts, commonly potassium ferrate (K_{2}FeO_{4}) or barium ferrate (BaFeO_{4}). One attraction to the proposed device is that the spent cathode would consist of a rust-like material, which is preferable to batteries based on toxic cadmium, manganese and nickel. Another attraction is potentially higher energy capacity.

== See also ==
=== Other iron-based batteries ===
- Lithium iron phosphate battery
- Lithium iron disulfide battery
- Nickel–iron battery

=== Other battery technologies ===
- List of battery types
- Lithium-ion battery
- Nanotechnology
- Nickel–cadmium battery
- Nickel–metal hydride battery
