= Silver–calcium battery =

Type of lead–acid battery

Silver–calcium alloy batteries are a type of lead–acid battery with grids made from lead–calcium–silver alloy, instead of the traditional lead–antimony alloy or newer lead–calcium alloy. They stand out for its resistance to corrosion and the destructive effects of high temperatures. The result of this improvement is manifested in increased battery life and maintaining a high starting power over time.

== Technological information ==
Technological improvements of this new alloy include increased corrosion resistance, greater resistance to high temperatures, longer shelf life, longer life of use (mean 6 years), minimal self-discharge and as having the highest breakout.

== Disadvantages ==
Silver-calcium batteries generally require a higher charging voltage (14.4 to 14.8 V) and deteriorate rapidly in vehicles which do not provide the required voltage range. Alternators which never reach the required voltage range will cause rapid sulfation due to the battery never being charged fully. As a general rule, silver-calcium batteries should not be installed in vehicles or systems which are not specifically designed for silver calcium battery chemistry. This also may occur with static chargers, some of which fail to charge these batteries.

== See also ==
- Automotive battery
- List of battery types
- Rechargeable battery
- VRLA battery
