= Penny battery =

Voltaic pile

A copper-zinc voltaic pile.

The penny battery is a voltaic pile which uses various coinage as the metal disks (pennies) of a traditional voltaic pile. The coins are stacked with pieces of electrolyte soaked paper in between (see diagram at right). The penny battery experiment is common during electrochemistry units in an educational setting.

Each cell in a penny battery can produce up to 0.8 volt, and many can be stacked together to produce higher voltages. Since the battery is a wet cell, the effectiveness will be reduced when the electrolyte evaporates.

== Coinage selection ==
As the name implies, Canadian pennies from 1997 to 2012 may serve the zinc electrode and 1942-1996 pennies as the copper. Alternatively, American pennies from 1982–present may be used as the zinc electrodes and 1944-1982 pennies as the copper electrodes. A variety of other coins can also be used, with varying results.

== Energy ==
Batteries convert the chemical energy of the two metals (electrodes) interacting with the acid on the matboard (electrolyte) into electrical energy. In this situation, the metal surface serves as the electrode and an electric current (movement of electrons from one metal to the other) is created when the wire connects both metal surfaces. In the first hour, a five cell penny battery is able to provide about 5×10^{−4} watts. Each cell is defined as a stack of a zinc penny, matboard, and a copper penny. Each cell can provide about 0.6 volts. Indicating that to power an LED light, needing 1.7 volts, only three cells need to be used. As time goes on the amount of energy that the battery can provide decreases. A five cell penny battery can last up to 6 1/2 hours providing minimal voltage. The stack of cells is also known as a voltaic pile.

== Chemistry ==
A penny battery functions as a standard voltaic pile, and is powered by a redox reaction between zinc and acid. Electrons flow through the electrolyte solution from zinc toward copper because zinc has a higher activity than copper. The acid releases positively charged hydrogen ions that combine with these electrons to form hydrogen gas, which escapes to the atmosphere. The release of gas corresponds with a large increase in entropy, making the reaction irreversible.

The reaction can be written as two separate reactions in different regions of the cell, or as one overall reaction. The reactions shown here use acetic acid, but a variety of other acids can also be used.

Reaction at anode
Zn(s) → Zn^{2+}(aq) + 2e^{−}

Reaction in electrolyte solution
2CH_{3}COOH(aq) + 2e^{−} → 2CH_{3}COO^{−}(aq) + H_{2}(g)

Overall reaction
Zn(s) + 2CH_{3}COOH(aq) → Zn^{2+}(aq) + 2CH_{3}COO^{−}(aq) + H_{2}(g)

=== Common misconceptions ===
Despite often being made of similar materials, this is not the same mechanism that powers a galvanic cell. Both types of cell can use acid as an electrolyte, copper as a cathode, and zinc as both an anode and as a substance to be oxidized. However they cause different substances to be reduced: voltaic piles reduce acid, and galvanic cells reduce copper. This is because galvanic cells contain dissolved copper ions, which can be reduced to form the more stable copper metal. Voltaic piles such as the penny battery start with all of their metal in solid form, so they don't contain any dissolved copper ions that can be reduced.

== See also ==
- List of battery types
