= Organic radical battery =

An organic radical battery (ORB) is a type of battery first developed in 2005. As of 2011, this type of battery was generally not available for the consumer, although their development at that time was considered to be approaching practical use. ORBs are potentially more environmentally friendly than conventional metal-based batteries, because they use organic radical polymers (flexible plastics) to provide electrical power instead of metals. ORBs are considered to be a high-power alternative to the Li-ion battery. Functional prototypes of the battery have been researched and developed by different research groups and corporations including the Japanese corporation NEC.

The organic radical polymers used in ORBs are examples of stable radicals, which are stabilized by steric and/or resonance effects. For example, the nitroxide radical in (2,2,6,6-tetramethylpiperidin-1-yl)oxyl (TEMPO), the most common subunit used in ORBs, is a stable oxygen-centered molecular radical. Here, the radical is stabilized by delocalization of electrons from the nitrogen onto the oxygen. TEMPO radicals can be attached to polymer backbones to form poly(2,2,6,6-tetramethyl- piperidenyloxyl-4-yl methacrylate) (PTMA). PTMA-based ORBs have a charge-density slightly higher than that of conventional Li-ion batteries, which should theoretically make it possible for an ORB to provide more charge than a Li-ion battery of similar size and weight.

As of 2007, ORB research was being directed mostly towards Hybrid ORB/Li-ion batteries because organic radical polymers with appropriate electrical properties for the anode are difficult to synthesize.

== Applications ==
As of 2015, ORBs were still under development and not in commercial use. Theoretically, ORBs could replace Li-ion batteries as more environmentally friendly batteries of similar or higher charge capacity and similar or shorter charge time. This would make ORBs well-suited for handheld electronic devices.

Organic radical batteries were first researched and developed by NEC in 2005 with the intent of being widely used to power tiny gadgets in the near future. They began with a size of 0.3 mm and an extremely quick charge time. Since the beginning of development, smart cards and RFID tags were the main targets for ORB usage. NEC has also worked on a larger 0.7 mm battery which is thicker, but also has a high charge capacity of 5 mAh.

Given the fast redox chemistry of nitroxide radicals, ORBs have been shown useful in keeping a computer running momentarily following a power outage. Although the amount of additional time provided is short, it is adequate to allow a computer to backup any crucial data before completely shutting down.

== Function ==
Radical polymer batteries rely on a redox reaction of an organic radical to generate an electrochemical potential. The most studied example of such an organic radical redox reaction is that of nitroxide radicals, such as the one found on a molecule called (2,2,6,6-Tetramethylpiperidin-1-yl)oxyl, also known as TEMPO. A nitroxide radical can be oxidized to an oxammonium cation or reduced to a hydroxylamine anion.

Redox chemistry of the TEMPO-group, which contains a nitroxide.

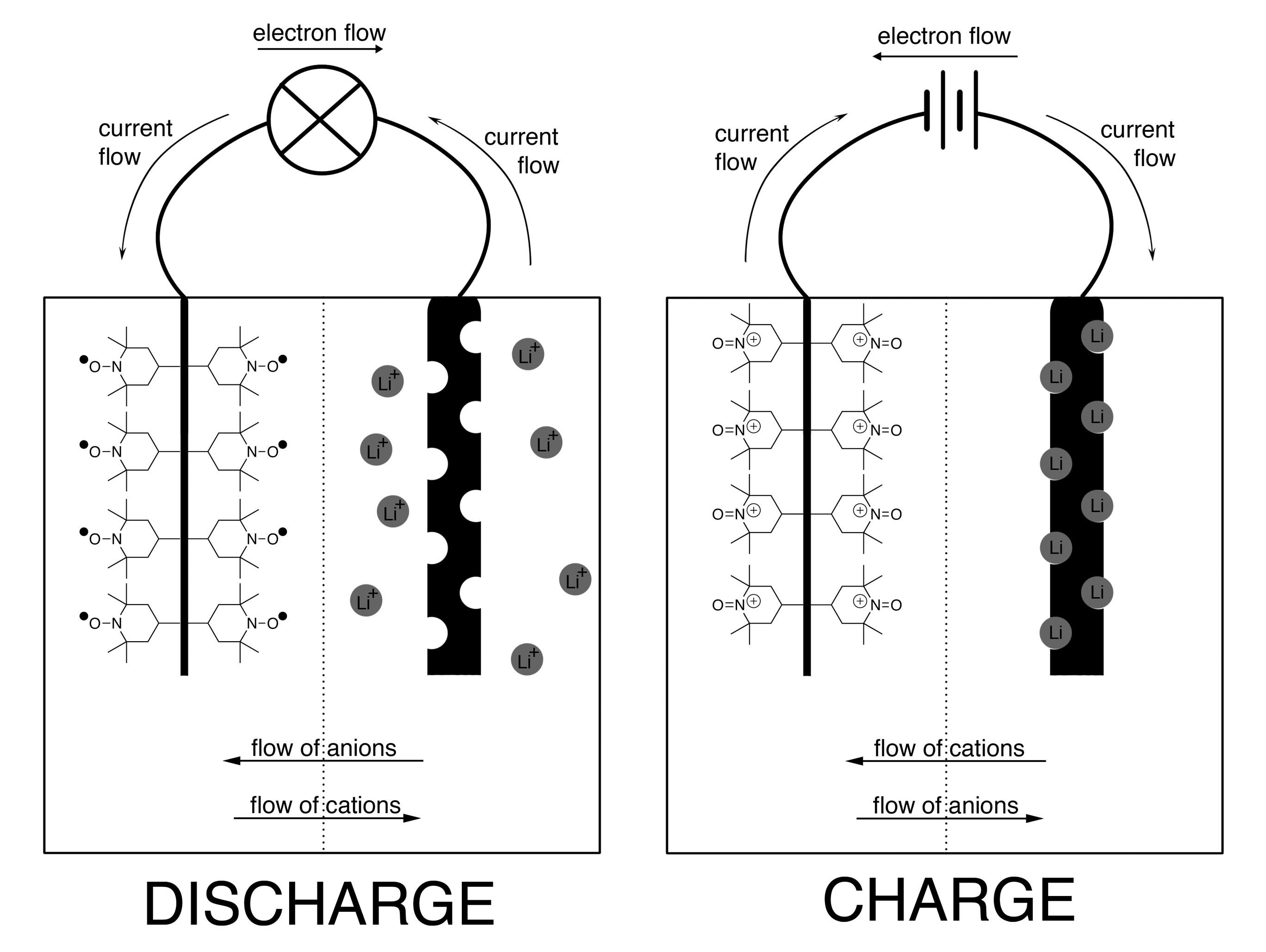
Discharge and charge of a hybrid ORB/Li-ion battery. The positive terminal is an organic radical polymer carrying the TEMPO-unit and the negative terminal is the same as found in a Li-ion battery.

The positive electrode uses the nitroxide - oxammonium cation redox pair to create an electrochemical potential, i.e. when the battery discharges the nitroxide radical is oxidized to the oxammonium cation and when the battery charges the oxammonium cation is reduced back to the nitroxide. The redox potentials for nitroxide show some variation and for the TEMPO nitroxide for this redox pair has an oxidation potential of +0.87 V. The positive electrode often takes the shape of a gel made of organic radical solids and graphite, permeated with electrolytes. Graphite is mixed with the polymer to increase the conductivity.

The negative electrode uses the nitroxide - hydroxylamine anion redox pair to create an electrochemical potential, i.e. when the battery discharges the nitroxide radical is reduced to the hydroxylamine anion and when the battery charges the hydroxylamine anion is oxidized back to the nitroxide. This half-reaction has an oxidation potential of -0.11 V. Since this half-reaction is not readily reversible as the half-reaction at the positive electrode, several research groups have steered away from using pure organic radical batteries and instead use metal/ORB hybrid batteries usually consist of a radical polymer cathode and the same anode found in rechargeable Li-ion batteries.

Much like a traditional battery such as a Li-ion battery, an organic radical battery consists of a cathode and an anode that are separated by a porous film and submerged in an electrolyte. In a pure organic radical battery, both terminals are made of organic radical polymers (a p-type and an n-type polymer), while a metal/ORB hybrid battery usually has a radical polymer cathode and a Li-ion/graphite anode.

== Synthesis of radical polymers ==
Several synthetic approaches have been utilized in the synthesis of polyradical species for use in organic radical batteries. The following methods have been used to synthesize poly(2,2,6,6- tetramethylpiperidinyloxy-4-yl methacrylate) (PTMA) and other nitroxide polymers.

=== Free-radical polymerization ===
Initial attempts to synthesize PTMA involved synthesizing the polymer without radical functionality via free radical polymerization. Once the polymer is synthesized, the nitroxide function can be introduced by oxidation.

Several groups have described synthesis of PTMA (4) using free radical polymerization of 2,2,6,6-tetramethylpiperidine methacrylate (2) with 2,2'-azobisiobutryonitrile (AIBN) as a radical initiator. The monomer was prepared via 2,2,6,6-tetramethyl-4-piperidinol (1) and methacryloyl chloride. The precursor neutral polymer (3) was oxidized to the stable radical polymer (4) by 3-chloroperoxybenzoic acid (mCPBA). Similar synthetic approaches have been proposed using 4-methacryloyloxy-N-hydroxy-2,2,6,6-tetramethylpiperidine as a monomer rather than 2,2,6,6- tetramethylpiperidine methacrylate.

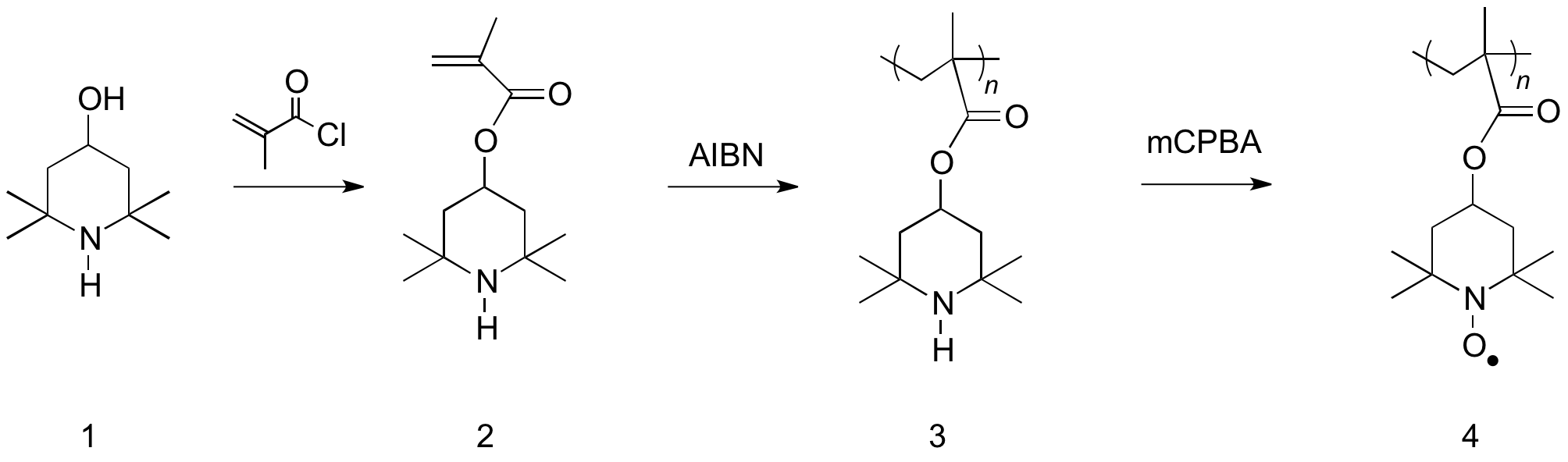
Free-radical polymerization of 4-methacryloyloxy-2,2,6,6-tetramethylpiperidine to form PTMA

Free-radical polymerization as a synthetic approach has several drawbacks. The most relevant limitation is the fact that precursor polymer oxidation never proceeds to 100%. As a result, the synthesized PTMA has between 65% and 81% of the theoretically possible amount of nitroxide groups. The decreased number of nitroxide groups negatively impacts the charge capacity of the polymer and limits its efficacy in organic radical batteries. Not only are there fewer nitroxide groups present, but also side reactions between non-oxidized groups and oxammonium cations diminishes the redox reversibility of the compound.

The difficulties of free-radical polymerization of PTMA could be avoided if the oxidation step were not necessary. However, because nitroxide radicals would react with any carbon radicals formed during polymerization, use of a monomer with a nitroxide radical isn't practical.

=== RAFT-mediated polymerization ===
One of the more recent techniques identified to synthesis PTMA is a type of free radical polymerization known as reversibly addition-fragmentation chain transfer (RAFT) mediated polymerization.

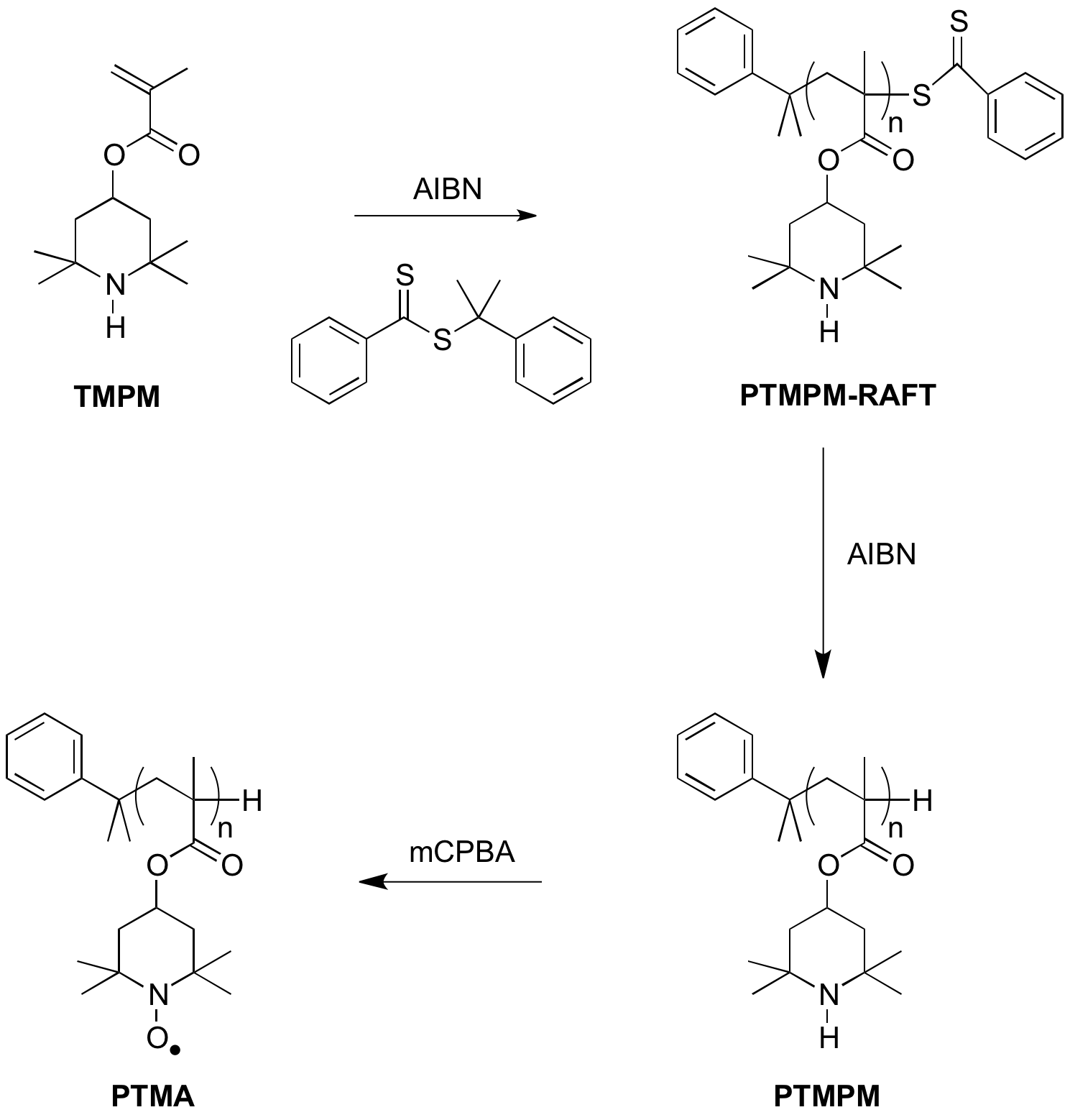
RAFT mediated polymerization of TEMPO

RAFT-mediated polymerization of PTMA utilizes the same starting monomer as free-radical polymerization. Using the RAFT-mediated approach to polymerize 2,2,6,6-tetramethyl-4-piperidinyl methacrylate (TMPM), the starting monomer, generates poly(2,2,6,6-tetramethyl-4-piperidnyl methacrylate) or PTMPM-RAFT. Direct oxidation of PTMPM-RAFT to PTMA is not practical, as direct oxidation causes side reactions involving the thiocaronylthiol end group of PTMPM-RAFT to react to form insoluble gel-like product. Rather, excess AIBN is used to remove the reactive terminus to form PTMPM, which can then be oxidized by meta-chloroperbenzoic acid to the desired PTMA.

Despite the promise of the RAFT-mediated polymerization, reported radical concentration was only 69 ± 4%.

=== Rhodium catalyzed polymerization ===
Rhodium-catalyzed polymerization of TEMPO-bearing monomers avoids some of the challenges free-radical polymerization poses because an oxidation step to generate the radical is not needed.

The structure of (2,2,6,6-Tetramethylpiperidine-1-yl)oxyl or TEMPO is shown below.

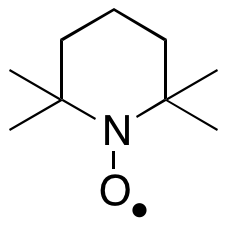
Structure of 2,2,6,6-Tetramethylpiperidineoxyl (TEMPO)

The following monomers (1-3) can be synthesized by condensation reaction between carboxyl groups with the amino or hydroxyl group of acetylene derivatives and various TEMPO derivatives. Polymerization of the monomers is completed using a Rhodium catalyst (nbd)Rh^{+}[n^{6}-C_{6}H_{5}B^{−}(C_{6}H_{5})_{3}]. Rhodium catalyzed synthesis of TEMPO containing polymers has been performed with high quantitative yield.

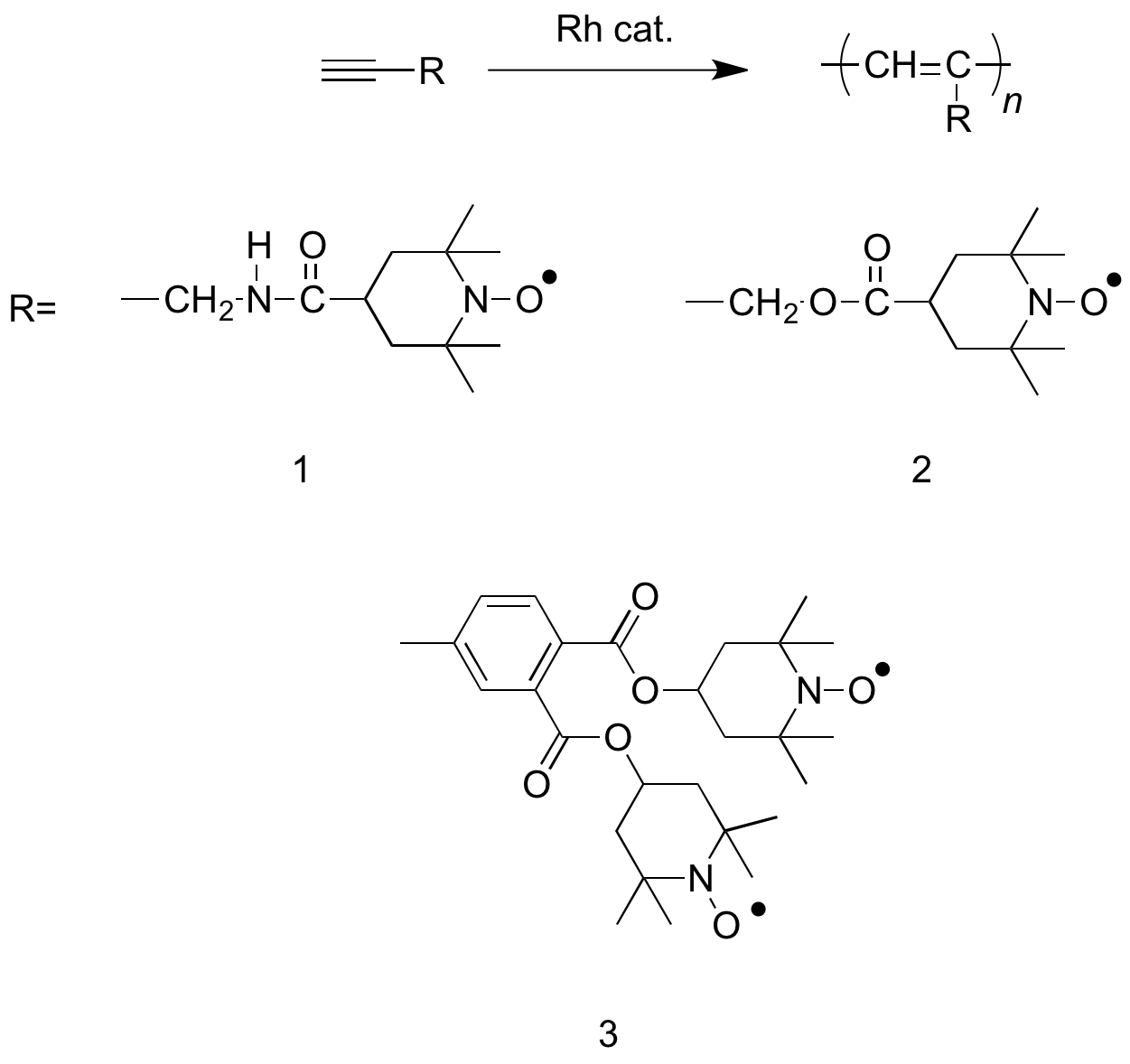
Rhodium-Catalyzed polymerization of TEMPO-bearing acetylene monomers

While use of a rhodium catalyst may be advantageous due to its high yield, use of a metal catalyst provides the additional challenge of having to separate the catalyst from the final product.

=== Anionic polymerization ===
Direct anionic polymerization of nitroxyl-containing monomers has also been used to synthesis PTMA. Anionic polymerization is not ideal because it must be carried using very strict procedures to avoid side reactions. Using 1,1-diphenylhexylllithium as an initiator of the reaction eliminates some side reactions by steric effects, however, the procedures necessary are not amenable to large-scale synthesis.

=== Group-transfer polymerization ===
Group-transfer polymerization, like rhodium-catalyzed polymerization of PTMA, allows for polymerization of nitroxyl radical monomers. Unlike rhodium-catalyzed monomers, group-transfer polymerization utilizes silicon to catalyze the polymerization.

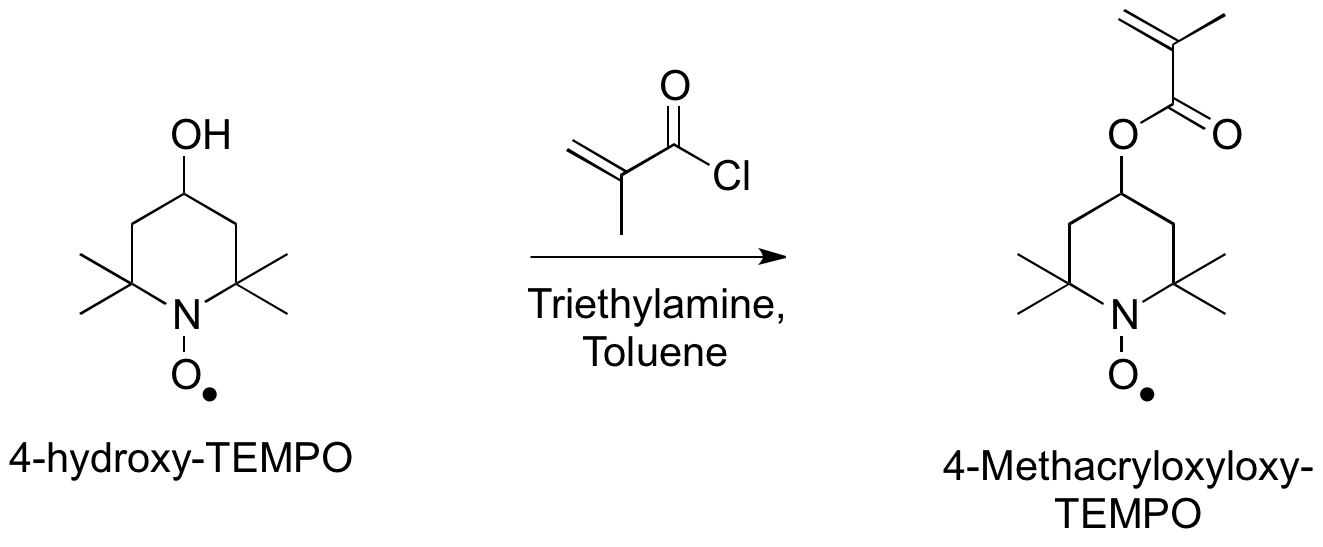
Synthesis of 4-Methacryloxyloxy-TEMPO Monomers

Preparation of the monomer, 4-methacryloxyloxy-TEMPO can be accomplished by acylation of 4-hydroxy-TEMPO with methacryloyl chloride.

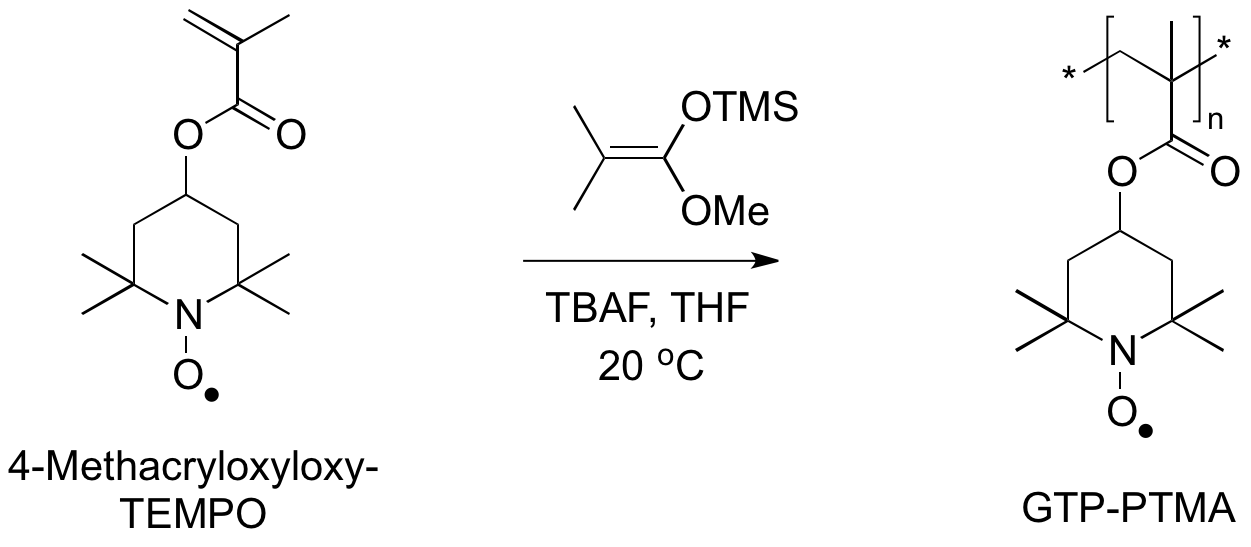
GTP polymerization of PTMA

Polymerization using 1-methoxy-2-methyl-1trimethylsilyloxy-propene (MTS) as a catalyst proceeds rapidly at room temperature to form PTMA. Tetrabutylammonium fluoride (TBAF) is used as an additional catalyst.

The following is a rationale for group-transfer polymerization.

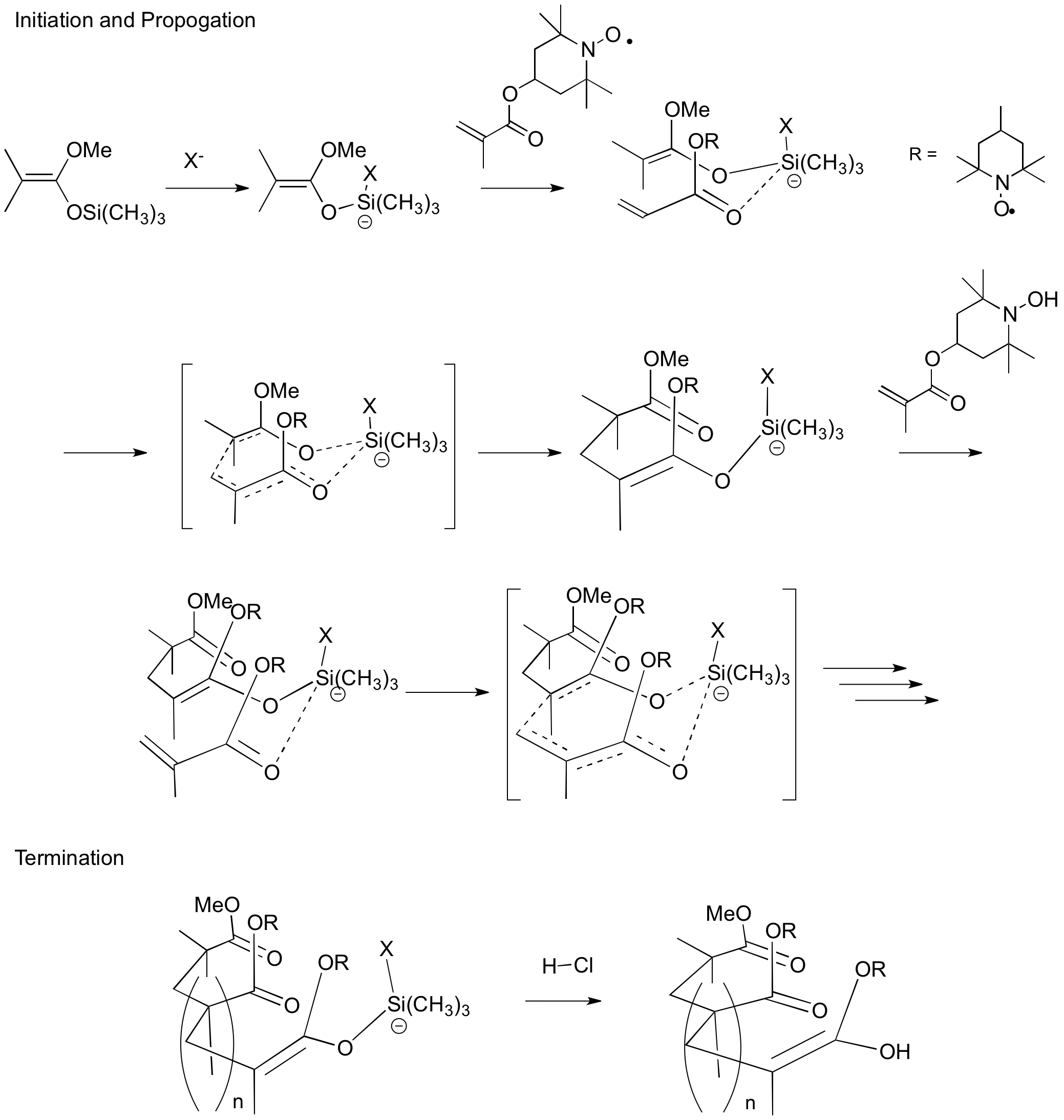
Mechanistic rationale for group transfer polymerization of PTMA

== Advantages ==
Organic radical batteries are much more environmentally friendly than Li-ion batteries because ORBs do not contain any metals that pose the problem of proper disposal. ORBs are non-toxic and non-flammable and do not require additional care when handling. Burning nitroxide radical polymers yields carbon dioxide, water, and nitrogen oxide without ash or odor.

While being environmentally friendly, they have properties that are otherwise comparable to Li-ion batteries: ORBs have a theoretical capacity of 147 mA h g^{−1}, which is slightly higher than that of Li-ion batteries with 140 mA h g^{−1}. ORBs also show comparable charge times and retain of charge-discharge capacity well, matching lithium-ion batteries at 75% of their initial charge after 500 cycles. Additionally, radical concentration in ORBs are stable enough at ambient conditions to remain unchanged for over a year. ORBs are also more flexible than Li-ion batteries, which would make them more adaptable to different design constraints, such as curved devices.

== Disadvantages and difficulties faced in development ==
A major difficulty in the development of ORBs is difficulty of synthesizing an appropriate negative electrode. This disadvantage arises because the redox reaction of the negative electrode is not fully reversible. Hybrid ORB/Li-ion batteries, in which the negative electrode is replaced by the one found in a Li-ion battery, have been proposed as a compromise to overcome this difficulty.

Polymerization reactions of the stable radical-containing monomer have also proved to be an area of difficulty in development. The stable organic radicals that are crucial to the functioning of the battery are sometimes consumed in side-reactions of various polymerization reactions. A research group has, however, successfully synthesized a cross-linked organic radical polymer while only losing 0.4% of the organic radicals in synthesis of the polymer.

== See also ==
- List of battery types
