= Oxygen ion battery =

Type of rechargeable battery

Oxygen-ion batteries (Oi batteries) are a type of rechargeable battery that works similarly to lithium-ion batteries. The electrodes in oxygen-ion batteries are perovskite-based ceramics instead of typical lithium-ion battery materials (graphite, iron, etc.). The batteries are fire-resistant, and highly durable.

The ceramic materials do not require toxic metals like those that are common in lithium-ion batteries.

The batteries are suitable for grid storage of power collected from sources such as wind and solar. Oxygen lost to side reactions can be replaced by ambient oxygen.

Oi batteries feature lower energy density than lithium-ion batteries, and they operate at higher temperatures, can reach 200–400 °C (392–752 °F).
