= Sodium hexafluorophosphate =

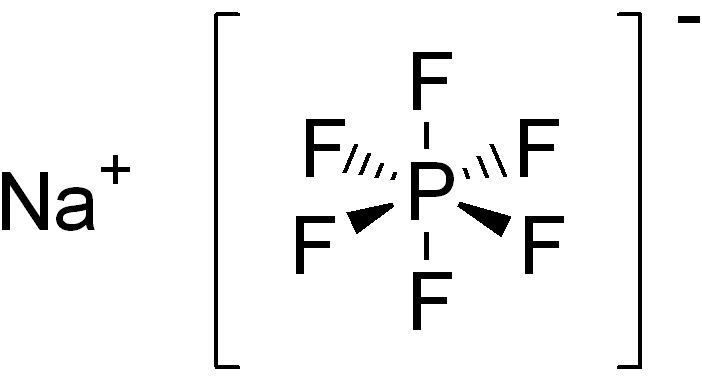

Names
- IUPAC name sodium hexafluorophosphate

Identifiers
CAS Number	21324-39-0
3D model (JSmol)	Interactive image
ChEBI	CHEBI:172377
ChEMBL	ChEMBL3327018
ChemSpider	4321427
ECHA InfoCard	100.040.288
EC Number	244-333-1
PubChem CID	5147921
CompTox Dashboard (EPA)	DTXSID30943875
- InChI: InChI=1S/F6P.Na/c1-7(2,3,4,5)6;/q-1;+1 Key: KMADQUOCJBLXRP-UHFFFAOYSA-N; InChI=1/F6P.Na/c1-7(2,3,4,5)6;/q-1;+1 Key: KMADQUOCJBLXRP-UHFFFAOYAE
- SMILES: F[P-](F)(F)(F)(F)F.[Na+]

Properties
Chemical formula	Na[PF_{6}]
Molar mass	167.95395 g/mol

Hazards
- GHS labelling
Pictograms	(GHS05: Corrosive) (GHS07: Exclamation mark)
Signal word	Danger
Hazard statements	H302, H312, H314, H332
Precautionary statements	P260, P264, P270, P271, P280, P301+P312, P301+P330+P331, P302+P352, P303+P361+P353, P304+P312, P304+P340, P305+P351+P338, P310, P312, P321, P322, P330, P363, P405, P501
Safety data sheet (SDS)	Oxford MSDS

Related compounds
Other anions	sodium tetrafluoroborate
Other cations	lithium hexafluorophosphate; ammonium hexafluorophosphate
- Except where otherwise noted, data are given for materials in their standard state (at 25 °C [77 °F], 100 kPa). verify (what is ?) Infobox references

Sodium hexafluorophosphate is an inorganic compound with the chemical formula NaPF_{6}.

It has been used as a component of a non-aqueous electrolyte in rechargeable sodium-ion batteries. NaPF_{6} can be prepared by the reaction:

PCl_{5} + NaCl + 6 HF → NaPF_{6} + 6 HCl
