= Sodium-ion battery =

Type of rechargeable battery

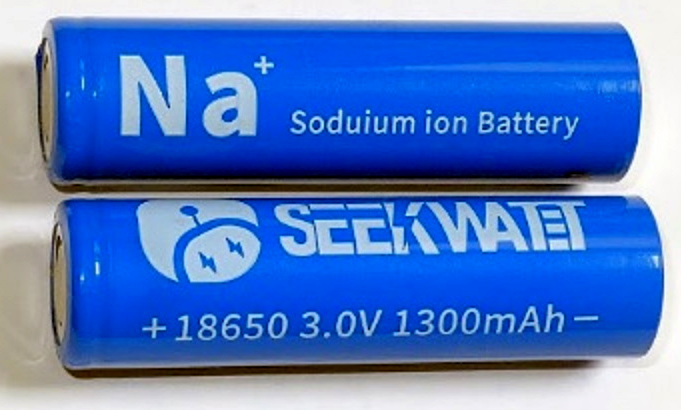
- A sodium-ion cell (size 18650)
- Specific energy: 0.27–0.72 MJ/kg (75–200 W·h/kg)
- Energy density: 250–375 W·h/L
- Cycle durability: "thousands" of cycles
- Nominal cell voltage: 3.0–3.1 V

A sodium-ion battery (NIB, SIB, or Na-ion battery) is a rechargeable battery that uses sodium ions (Na^{+}) as charge carriers. In some cases, its working principle and cell construction are similar to those of lithium-ion battery (LIB) types, but different in that the battery is manufactured with sodium instead of lithium as the intercalating ion. Sodium belongs to the same group in the periodic table as lithium and thus has similar chemical properties; the term 'SIB' likewise describes a family of different chemistries. However, designs such as aqueous batteries are quite different from LIBs.

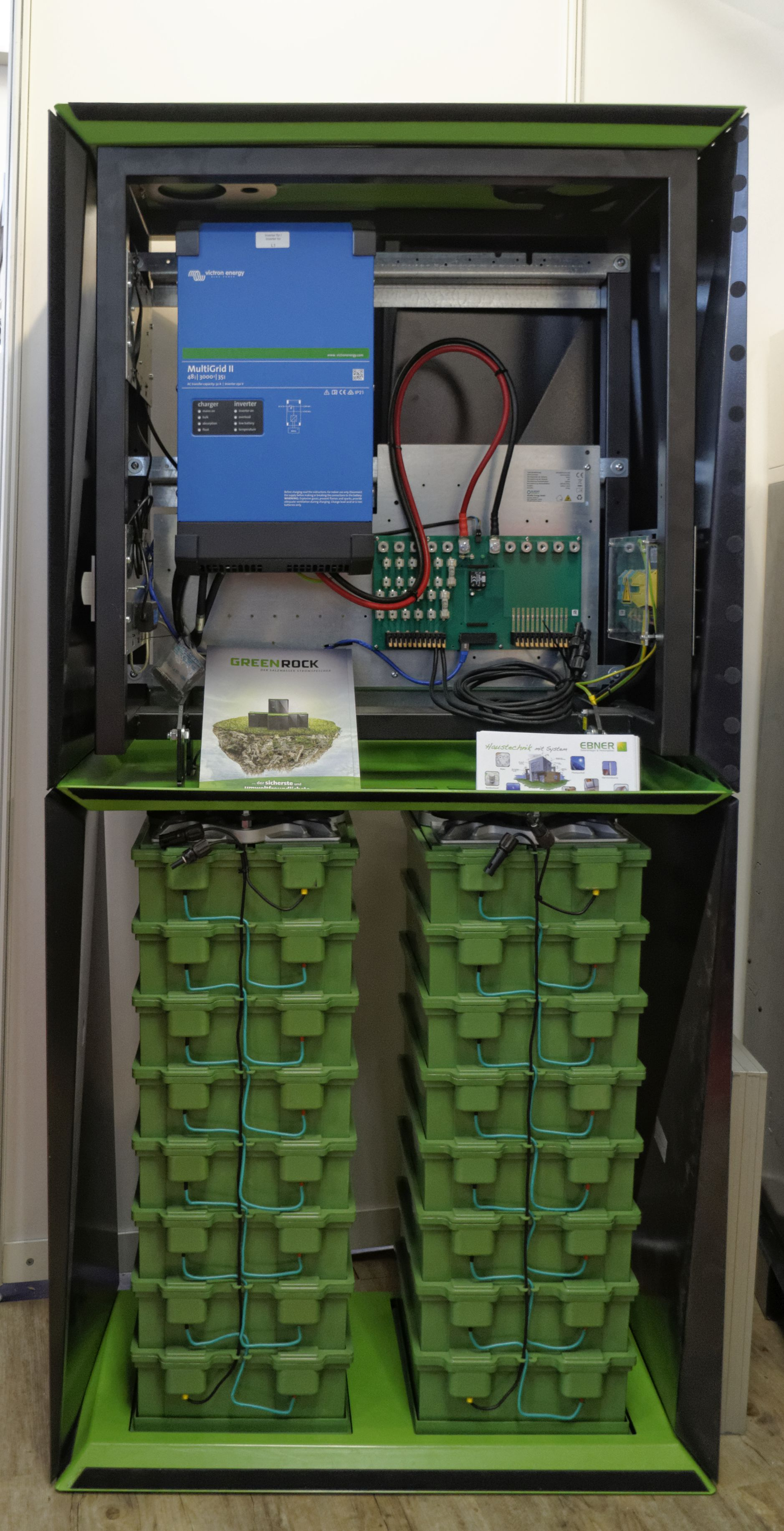
A sodium-ion accumulator stack (Germany, 2019)

SIBs received academic and commercial interest in the 2010s and early 2020s, largely due to lithium's high cost, uneven geographic distribution, and environmentally damaging extraction process. Unlike lithium, sodium is abundant, particularly in saltwater. Further, cobalt, copper, and nickel are not required for many types of sodium-ion batteries as they are in Lithium batteries, and abundant iron-based materials (such as NaFeO_{2} with the $\ce{Fe3+/Fe4+}$ redox pair) work well in $\ce{Na+}$ batteries. This is because the ionic radius of Na^{+} (116 pm) is substantially larger than that of Fe^{2+} and Fe^{3+} (69–92 pm depending on the spin state), whereas the ionic radius of Li^{+} is similar (90 pm). Similar ionic radii of lithium and iron allow them to mix in the cathode during battery cycling, costing cyclable charge. A downside of the larger ionic radius of Na^{+} is slower intercalation kinetics.

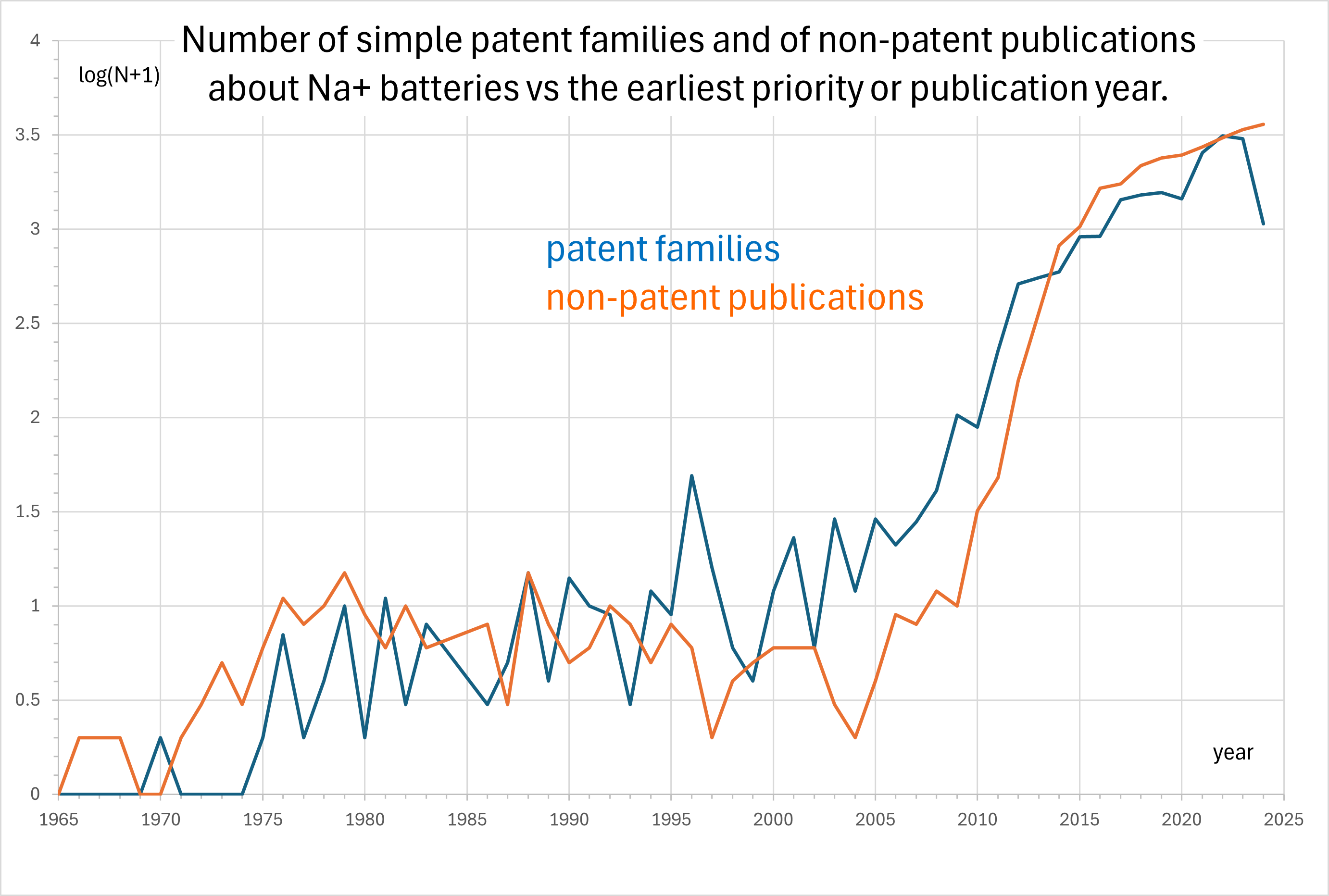
Number of simple patent families and of non-patent publications about Na^{+} batteries vs the earliest priority or publication year. (Note: log scale, e.g. "3" means 1000 publ.)

The modern development of Na^{+} batteries for production started in the 1990s. Companies such as HiNa and CATL in China, Faradion in the United Kingdom, Tiamat in France, Northvolt in Sweden, and Natron Energy in the US, claimed to be close to commercialization, employing sodium layered transition metal oxides (Na_{x}TMO_{2}), Prussian white (a Prussian blue analogue) or vanadium phosphate as cathode materials.

Sodium-ion accumulators are operational for fixed electrical grid storage, and vehicles with sodium-ion battery packs are commercially available for light scooters made by Yadea, which use HuaYu sodium-ion battery technology.

== History ==
Sodium-ion battery development took place in the 1970s and early 1980s. However, by the 1990s, lithium-ion batteries had demonstrated more commercial promise, causing interest in sodium-ion batteries to decline. In the early 2010s, sodium-ion batteries experienced a resurgence, driven largely by the increasing cost of lithium-ion battery raw materials. Also, the number of patent families reached the number of non-patent publication after ca. 2020, which usually signify the fact that the technology reached the commercialization stage.

== Operating principle ==
SIB cells consist of a cathode based on a sodium-based material, an anode (not necessarily a sodium-based material) and a liquid electrolyte containing dissociated sodium salts in polar protic or aprotic solvents. During charging, sodium ions move from the cathode to the anode while electrons travel through the external circuit. During discharge, the reverse process occurs.

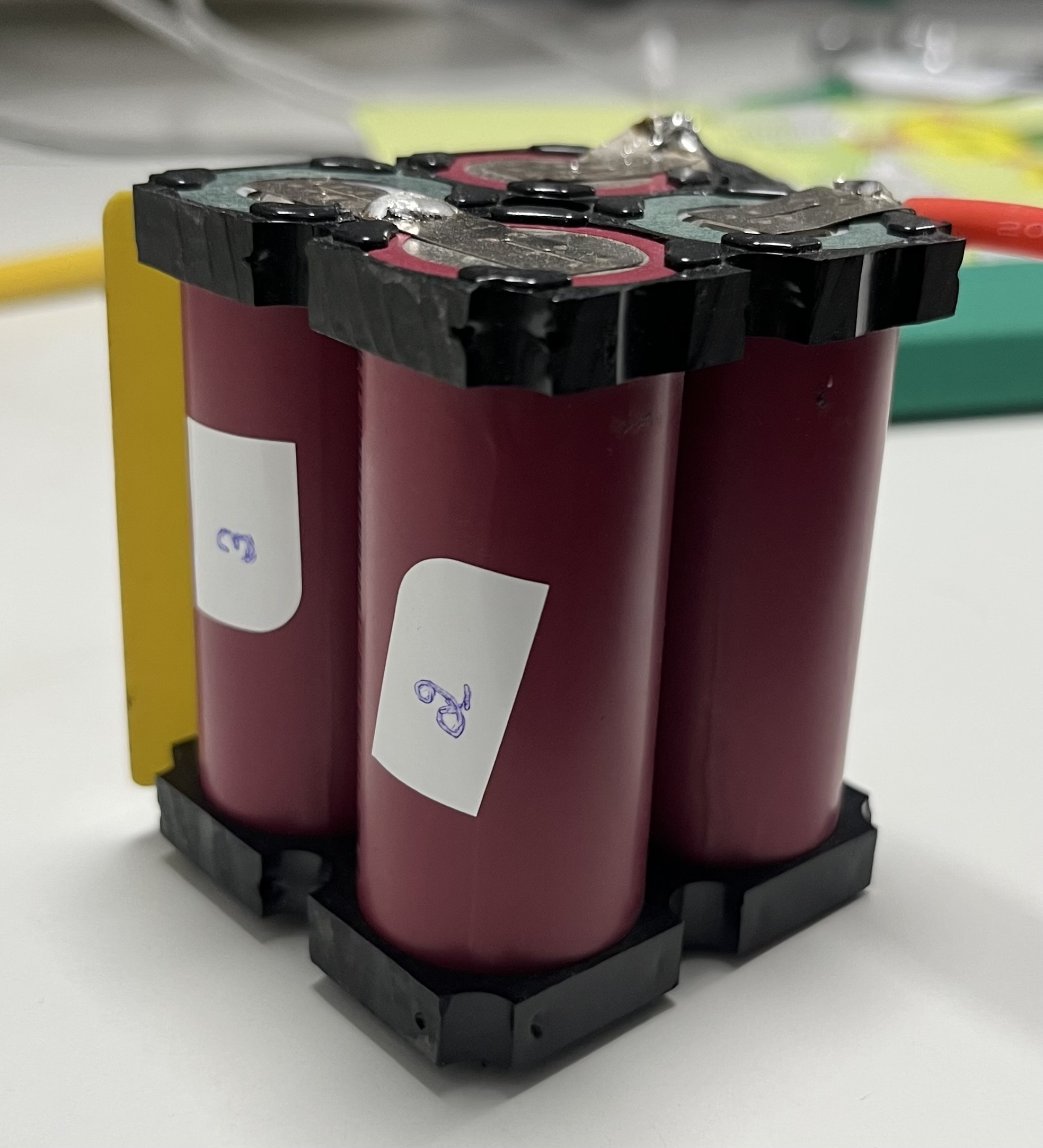
Sodium ion 2.5 Ah cells

== Materials ==
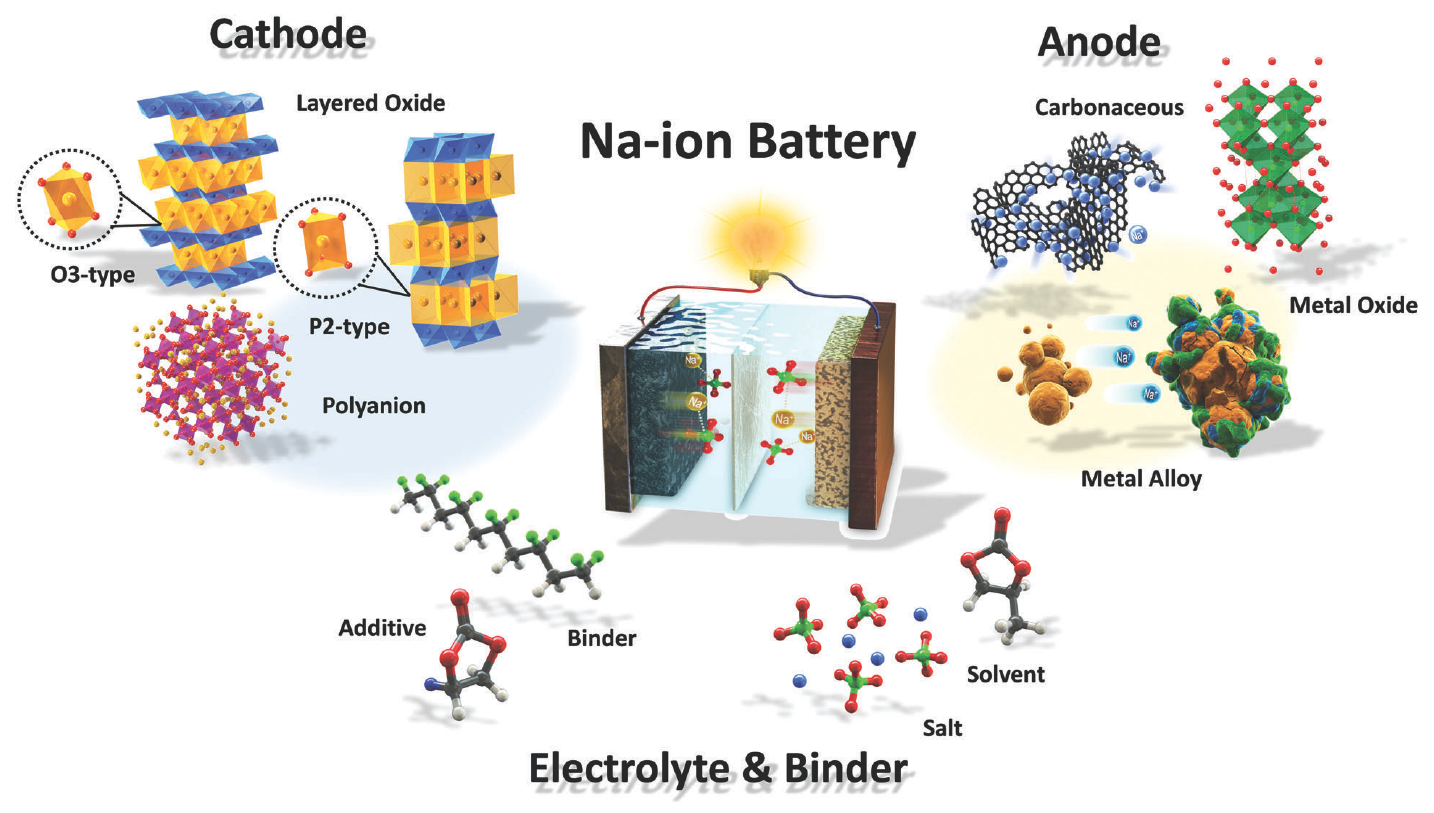
Illustration of the various electrode structures in sodium-ion batteries

Due to the physical and electrochemical properties of sodium, SIBs require different materials from those used for LIBs.

=== Anodes ===
==== Carbons ====
SIBs can use hard carbon, a disordered carbon material consisting of a non-graphitizable, non-crystalline and amorphous carbon. Hard carbon's ability to absorb sodium was discovered in 2000. This anode was shown to deliver 300 mAh/g with a sloping potential profile above ~0.15 V vs Na/Na^{+}. It accounts for roughly half of the capacity and a flat potential profile (a potential plateau) below ~0.15 V vs Na/Na^{+}. Such capacities are comparable to 300–360 mAh/g of graphite anodes in lithium-ion batteries. The first sodium-ion cell using hard carbon was demonstrated in 2003 and showed a 3.7 V average voltage during discharge. Hard carbon was the preferred choice of Faradion due to its excellent combination of capacity, (lower) working potentials, and cycling stability. Notably, nitrogen-doped hard carbons display even larger specific capacity of 520 mAh/g at 20 mA/g with stability over 1000 cycles.

==== Recent advances in hard carbon anodes ====
Recent studies have focused on modifying the microstructure and surface chemistry of hard carbon to improve its performance as an anode material for sodium-ion batteries (SIBs). Hard carbon stores sodium through a combination of adsorption on defect sites, intercalation between turbostratic graphene layers, and filling of nanopores with sodium clusters. Its electrochemical behavior depends on the arrangement of pseudo-graphitic domains and the distribution of open and closed pores within the carbon matrix.

To achieve high capacity and fast-charging performance, researchers have explored structural engineering approaches such as enlarging the interlayer distance and tuning the pore structure. Nitrogen doping and pore activation have been shown to increase interlayer spacing and create additional active sites for sodium storage, which improves rate capability and reversibility. Control over the size and volume fraction of closed pores affects sodium cluster formation, influencing the low-potential plateau capacity and cycling stability.

Biomass-derived hard carbon with optimized pseudo-graphitic domains and tailored closed pores has been reported to reach a reversible capacity of 280 mAh/g at 1 A/g, retaining over 90% of its capacity after 1000 cycles. These findings indicate that microstructural design and heteroatom doping are effective strategies for improving the performance of hard carbon anodes in sodium-ion batteries.

In 2015, researchers demonstrated that graphite could co-intercalate sodium in ether-based electrolytes. Low capacities around 100 mAh/g were obtained with relatively high working potentials between 0 and 1.2 V vs Na/Na^{+}.

One drawback of carbonaceous materials is that, because their intercalation potentials are fairly negative, they are limited to non-aqueous systems.

Graphene Janus particles have been used in experimental sodium-ion batteries to increase energy density. One side provides interaction sites while the other provides inter-layer separation. Energy density reached 337 mAh/g.

Carbon arsenide (AsC_{5}) mono/bilayer has been explored as an anode material due to high specific capacity (794/596 mAh/g), low expansion (1.2%), and ultra low diffusion barrier (0.16/0.09 eV), indicating rapid charge/discharge cycle capability, during sodium intercalation. After sodium adsorption, a carbon arsenide anode maintains structural stability at 300 K, indicating long cycle life.

==== Metal alloys ====
Numerous reports described anode materials storing sodium via alloy reaction and/or conversion reaction. Alloying sodium metal brings the benefits of regulating sodium-ion transport and shielding the accumulation of electric field at the tip of sodium dendrites. Wang, et al. reported that a self-regulating alloy interface of nickel antimony (NiSb) was chemically deposited on Na metal during discharge. This thin layer of NiSb regulates the uniform electrochemical plating of Na metal, lowering overpotential and offering dendrite-free plating/stripping of Na metal over 100 h at a high areal capacity of 10 mAh cm^{−2}.

Many metals and semi-metals (Pb, P, Sn, Ge, etc.) form stable alloys with sodium at room temperature. Unfortunately, the formation of such alloys is usually accompanied by a large volume change, which in turn results in the pulverization (crumbling) of the material after a few cycles. For example, with tin sodium forms an alloy Na_{15}Sn_{4}, which is equivalent to 847 mAh/g specific capacity, with a resulting enormous volume change up to 420%.

In one study, Li et al. prepared sodium and metallic tin Na_{15}Sn_{4}/Na through a spontaneous reaction. This anode could operate at a high temperature of 90 °C (194 °F) in a carbonate solvent at 1 mA/cm^{2} with 1 mAh/cm^{2} loading, and the full cell exhibited a stable charge-discharge cycling for 100 cycles at a current density of 2C. (2C means that full charge or discharge was achieved in 0.5 hour). Despite sodium alloy's ability to operate at extreme temperatures and regulate dendritic growth, the severe stress-strain experienced on the material in the course of repeated storage cycles limits cycling stability, especially in large-format cells.

Researchers from Tokyo University of Science achieved 478 mAh/g with nano-sized magnesium particles, announced in December 2020.

In 2024, Dalhousie University researchers enhanced sodium-ion battery performance by replacing hard carbon in the negative electrode with lead (Pb) and single wall carbon nanotubes (SWCNTs). This combination significantly increased volumetric energy density and eliminated capacity fade in half cells. SWCNTs endured active material connectivity, boosting capacity to 475 mAh/g and reducing losses, compared to 430 mAh/g in Pb cell without SWCNTs.

==== Oxides ====
Some sodium titanate phases such as Na_{2}Ti_{3}O_{7}, or NaTiO_{2}, delivered capacities around 90–180 mAh/g at low working potentials (< 1 V vs Na/Na^{+}), though cycling stability was limited to a few hundred cycles.

==== Molybdenum disulphide ====
In 2021, researchers from China tried layered structure MoS_{2} as a new type of anode for sodium-ion batteries. A dissolution-recrystallization process densely assembled carbon layer-coated MoS_{2} nanosheets onto the surface of polyimide-derived N-doped carbon nanotubes. This kind of C-MoS_{2}/NCNTs anode can store 348 mAh/g at 2 A/g, with a cycling stability of 82% capacity after 400 cycles at 1 A/g. TiS_{2} is another potential material for SIBs because of its layered structure, but has yet to overcome the problem of capacity fade, since TiS_{2} suffers from poor electrochemical kinetics and relatively weak structural stability. In 2021, researchers from Ningbo, China employed pre-potassiated TiS_{2}, presenting rate capability of 165.9mAh/g and a cycling stability of 85.3% capacity after 500 cycles.

==== Other anodes for Na^{+} ====
Some other materials, such as mercury, electroactive polymers and sodium terephthalate derivatives, have also been demonstrated in laboratories, but did not provoke commercial interest.

=== Cathodes ===
SIBs can use more affordable materials in their construction, such as generally cheaper cathode materials like manganese and iron, and the use of aluminium collectors instead of copper ones in LIBs.

==== Oxides ====
Many layered transition metal oxides can reversibly intercalate sodium ions upon reduction. This is conventionally understood to occur through a change in oxidation state of the transition metal cations in the oxide lattice. However, in recent years, the understanding of sodium insertion and removal in these lattices has shifted, and it is now appreciated that anionic redox plays a determining role in sodium-ion battery cathodes, particularly those containing Manganese, which does not change its oxidation state during cycling. Sodic transition metal oxides typically have a higher tap density and a lower electronic resistivity, than other cathode materials (such as phosphates). Due to a larger size of the Na^{+} ion (116 pm) compared to Li^{+} ion (90 pm), cation mixing between Na^{+} and first row transition metal ions (which is common in the case of Li+) usually does not occur. Thus, low-cost iron and manganese oxides can be used for Na-ion batteries, whereas Li-ion batteries require the use of more expensive cobalt and nickel oxides. The drawback of the larger size of Na^{+} ion is its slower intercalation kinetics compared to Li^{+} ion and the presence of multiple intercalation stages with different voltages and kinetic rates.

A P2-type Na_{2/3}Fe_{1/2}Mn_{1/2}O_{2} oxide from earth-abundant Fe and Mn resources can reversibly store 190 mAh/g at average discharge voltage of 2.75 V vs Na/Na^{+} utilising the Fe^{3+/4+} redox couple – on par or better than commercial lithium-ion cathodes such as LiFePO_{4} or LiMn_{2}O_{4}. However, its sodium deficient nature lowered energy density. Significant efforts were expended in developing Na-richer oxides. A mixed P3/P2/O3-type Na_{0.76}Mn_{0.5}Ni_{0.3}Fe_{0.1}Mg_{0.1}O_{2} was demonstrated to deliver 140 mAh/g at an average discharge voltage of 3.2 V vs Na/Na^{+} in 2015. In particular, the O3-type NaNi_{1/4}Na_{1/6}Mn_{2/12}Ti_{4/12}Sn_{1/12}O_{2} oxide can deliver 160 mAh/g at average voltage of 3.22 V vs Na/Na^{+}, while a series of doped Ni-based oxides of the stoichiometry Na_{a}Ni_{(1−x−y−z)}Mn_{x}Mg_{y}Ti_{z}O_{2} can deliver 157 mAh/g in a sodium-ion "full cell" with a hard carbon anode at average discharge voltage of 3.2 V utilising the Ni^{2+/4+} redox couple. Such performance in full cell configuration is better or on par with commercial lithium-ion systems. A Na_{0.67}Mn_{1−x}Mg_{x}O_{2} cathode material exhibited a discharge capacity of 175 mAh/g for Na_{0.67}Mn_{0.95}Mg_{0.05}O_{2}. This cathode contained only abundant elements. Copper-substituted Na_{0.67}Ni_{0.3−x}Cu_{x}Mn_{0.7}O_{2} cathode materials showed a high reversible capacity with better capacity retention. In contrast to the copper-free Na_{0.67}Ni_{0.3−x}Cu_{x}Mn_{0.7}O_{2} electrode, the as-prepared Cu-substituted cathodes deliver better sodium storage. However, cathodes with Cu are more expensive.

==== Oxoanions ====
Research has also considered cathodes based on oxoanions. Such cathodes offer lower tap density, lowering energy density than oxides. On the other hand, a stronger covalent bonding of the polyanion positively impacts cycle life and safety and increases the cell voltage. Among polyanion-based cathodes, sodium vanadium phosphate and fluorophosphate have demonstrated excellent cycling stability and in the latter, an acceptably high capacity (⁓120 mAh/g) at high average discharge voltages (⁓3.6 V vs Na/Na^{+}). Besides that, sodium manganese silicate has also been demonstrated to deliver a very high capacity (>200 mAh/g) with decent cycling stability. A French startup TIAMAT develops Na^{+} ion batteries based on a sodium-vanadium-phosphate-fluoride cathode material Na_{3}V_{2}(PO_{4})_{2}F_{3}, which undergoes two reversible 0.5 e−/V transitions: at 3.2V and at 4.0 V. A startup from Singapore, SgNaPlus is developing and commercialising Na_{3}V_{2}(PO_{4})_{2}F_{3} cathode material, which shows very good cycling stability, utilising the non-flammable glyme-based electrolyte.

==== Prussian blue and analogues ====
Numerous research groups investigated the use of Prussian blue and various Prussian blue analogues (PBAs) as cathodes for Na^{+}-ion batteries. The ideal formula for a discharged material is Na_{2}M[Fe(CN)_{6}], and it corresponds to the theoretical capacity of ca. 170 mAh/g, which is equally split between two one-electron voltage plateaus. Such high specific charges are rarely observed only in PBA samples with a low number of structural defects.

For example, the patented rhombohedral Na_{2}MnFe(CN)_{6} displaying 150–160 mAh/g in capacity and a 3.4 V average discharge voltage and rhombohedral Prussian white Na_{1.88(5)}Fe[Fe(CN)_{6}]·0.18(9)H_{2}O displaying initial capacity of 158 mAh/g and retaining 90% capacity after 50 cycles.

While Ti, Mn, Fe and Co PBAs show a two-electron electrochemistry, the Ni PBA shows only one-electron (Ni is not electrochemically active in the accessible voltage range). Iron-free PBA Na_{2}Mn^{II}[Mn^{II}(CN)_{6}] is also known. It has a fairly large reversible capacity of 209 mAh/g at C/5, but its voltage is unfortunately low (1.8 V versus Na^{+}/Na).

==== Organic ====
Bis-tetraaminobenzoquinone (TAQ), a low-bandgap, conductive, and highly insoluble layered metal-free material was used as an organic cathode. It exhibited a theoretical capacity of 355 mAh g–1. Researchers used a four-electron redox process, and achieved an electrode-level energy density of 606 Wh kg–1electrode (90 wt % active material) with excellent cycling stability. Forming the material in the presence of as little as 2 wt % carboxyl-functionalized carbon nanotubes improved charge transport and kinetics. Cathode energy density reached 472 Wh kg–1 when charging/discharging in 90 s with specific power of 31.6 kW kg–1.

=== Electrolytes ===
Sodium-ion batteries can use aqueous and non-aqueous electrolytes. The limited electrochemical stability window of water results in lower voltages and limited energy densities. Non-aqueous carbonate ester polar aprotic solvents extend the voltage range. These include ethylene carbonate, dimethyl carbonate, diethyl carbonate, and propylene carbonate. The most widely used salts in non-aqueous electrolytes are NaClO_{4} and sodium hexafluorophosphate (NaPF_{6}) dissolved in a mixture of these solvents. It is a well-established fact that these carbonate-based electrolytes are flammable, which pose safety concerns in large-scale applications. A type of glyme-based electrolyte, with sodium tetrafluoroborate as the salt is demonstrated to be non-flammable. In addition, NaTFSI (TFSI = bis(trifluoromethane)sulfonimide) and NaFSI (FSI = bis(fluorosulfonyl)imide, NaDFOB (DFOB = difluoro(oxalato)borate) and NaBOB (bis(oxalato)borate) anions have emerged lately as new interesting salts. Electrolyte additives can be used as well to improve the performance metrics.

=== Aqueous sodium-ion batteries ===
Aqueous sodium-ion batteries (ASIBs) have gained significant attention in energy storage and conversion because they offer high safety, low cost, and improved environmental compatibility. Cathodes represent the primary constraint on ASIB performance. Intercalation-type materials offer only a finite number of Na^{+} storage sites, which limits the extent to which their specific capacity can be improved. Sodium transition-metal oxides (NaxMO_{2}) are among the most extensively studied ASIB cathodes due to their open structures, electrochemical stability, high working voltage, and lower cost compared with lithium analogues (75). Their properties can be tuned by varying Na content, yielding layered oxides (x < 0.5) and tunnel oxides (x > 0.5). Layered P2- and O3-type oxides offer high capacities and fast Na^{+} diffusion (76), illustrated by P2-Na_{2}/_{3}Ni_{1}/_{3}Mn_{2}/_{3}O_{2} delivering 157 mAh/g in Na_{2}SO_{4} electrolyte (70) and P2-Na_{2}/_{3}Ni_{1}/_{4}Mn_{3}/_{4}O_{2} achieving a 1.2 V full-cell voltage when paired with NTP/graphite in a hybrid Na_{2}SO_{4}/Li_{2}SO_{4} electrolyte. However, P2 phases undergo P2→O2 transitions at low Na content, while O3 phases such as NaMnO_{2} suffer from air/moisture instability; heteroatom substitution, such as Cu/Ti-doping in NaNi_{0}._{45}Mn_{0}._{5}O_{2}, significantly improves air stability and cycling performance. Tunnel oxides like Na_{0}._{44}MnO_{2} enable rapid Na^{+} transport and excellent cycling, achieving stable capacities in Na_{2}SO_{4} and NaOH electrolytes, and their performance can be enhanced through Ti substitution and Na-rich compositions or even extended to potassium-based analogues such as K_{0}._{27}MnO_{2}. Prussian blue analogs (PBAs), with their open 3D framework, fast kinetics, and facile synthesis, offer capacities up to ~80 mAh/g, and some two-electron PBAs reach theoretical capacities of 170 mAh/g; reducing defects and adding Co^{2+} can greatly improve stability and capacity retention. Polyanionic compounds—including phosphates, fluorophosphates, and NASICON-type materials—provide stable 3D host structures and high voltage operation, though they often face interfacial resistance and transition-metal dissolution issues. Improvements through carbon coating and metal substitution have enabled materials like NaFePO_{4} to reach high reversible capacities and favorable high-temperature performance, while fluorophosphates such as Na_{3}V_{2}(PO_{4})_{2}F_{3}-SWCNT deliver higher working voltages. Recent advances in mixed phosphate–pyrophosphate frameworks, such as Na_{4}Fe_{3}(PO_{4})_{2}P_{2}O_{7}, have demonstrated high power density, long cycle life, and even low-temperature operation. Graphite is generally not used as an anode in ASIBs, as the NaxC compounds it forms are thermodynamically unstable. This instability leads to low reversible capacity and an unfavorable reaction potential. Activated carbon (AC) is a structurally simple and easily manufactured carbon material that can be paired with suitable cathodes to form asymmetric hybrid capacitor–battery systems. For example, a Na_{4}Mn_{9}O_{18}//Na_{2}SO_{4}/AC supercapacitor achieved an energy density of 34.8 Wh/kg and exhibited excellent cycling stability, retaining 84% of its capacity after 4,000 cycles at 18 C. In addition, other carbon-based materials—such as carbon microbeads and carbon fibers—have also been explored as potential anodes for sodium storage. However, many carbon materials still face challenges including low initial Coulombic efficiency and sluggish Na^{+} intercalation kinetics. Nanoengineering offers effective solutions to these limitations by shortening Na^{+} and electron diffusion pathways, creating reticular architectures that improve mechanical robustness and buffer volume changes during cycling, and increasing surface area and active sites. These structural advantages make nanoscale engineering an essential strategy for enhancing the electrochemical performance of carbon-based anodes in ASIBs.

== Comparison ==
Sodium-ion batteries have several advantages over competing battery technologies. Compared to lithium-ion batteries, sodium-ion batteries have somewhat lower cost, better safety characteristics (for the aqueous versions), and similar power delivery characteristics, but also a lower energy density (especially the aqueous versions). Round-trip efficiency is mostly equal, but is lower for sodium-ion at a low state of charge (SOC).

The table below compares how NIBs in general fare against the three established rechargeable battery technologies in the market currently: the nickel-manganese-cobalt (NMC) lithium-ion battery, the lithium iron phosphate battery (LFP) and the rechargeable lead–acid battery.

Battery comparison
	Sodium-ion battery	NMC battery	LFP battery	Lead–acid battery
Cost per kilowatt-hour of capacity	$40–77 (theoretical in 2019)	$128 (average in 2025)	$81 (average in 2025)	$100–300
Volumetric energy density	250–375 W·h/L (2020), based on prototypes	200–683 W·h/L (2019)	227–396 W·h/L	80–90 W·h/L
Gravimetric energy density (specific energy)	75–175 W·h/kg (2020) Low end for aqueous, high end for carbon batteries	120–260 W·h/kg	175–200 Wh/kg	35–40 Wh/kg
Power-to-weight ratio	~1,000 W/kg	~340–420 W/kg (NMC),	~175–425 W/kg (LFP)	180 W/kg
Cycles at 80% depth of discharge (Note: The number of charge-discharge cycles a battery supports depends on multiple considerations, including depth of discharge, rate of discharge, rate of charge, and temperature. The values shown here reflect generally favorable conditions.)	Hundreds to thousands	3,500	2000–6,000	900
Safety	Low risk for aqueous batteries, high risk for Na in carbon batteries, including thermal runaway above 50% SOC	High risk (Note: See Lithium-ion battery safety.)		Moderate risk
Materials	Abundant	Scarce and toxic	Abundant except lithium	Abundant and toxic
Cycling stability	High (negligible self-discharge)	High (negligible self-discharge)	High (negligible self-discharge)	Moderate (high self-discharge)
Direct current round-trip efficiency	up to 92% at high SOC	85–95%		70–90%
Temperature range (Note: Temperature affects charging behavior, capacity, and battery lifetime, and affects each of these differently, at different temperature ranges for each. The values given here are general ranges for battery operation.)	−20 °C to 60 °C	Acceptable:−20 °C to 60 °C. Optimal: 15 °C to 35 °C		−20 °C to 60 °C

== Recent R&D ==
=== University of Chicago/UC San Diego ===
In July 2024, the University of Chicago and UC San Diego developed an anode-free sodium solid-state battery that they claimed was cheaper, safer, fast charging, and high capacity.

=== Jawaharlal Nehru Centre for Advanced Scientific Research (JNCASR) ===
A research team at the Jawaharlal Nehru Centre for Advanced Scientific Research (JNCASR), an Indian autonomous institute of the Department of Science and Technology (DST) has developed a super-fast charging sodium-ion battery (SIB) based on a NASICON-type cathode and anode material, that can charge up to 80% in just six minutes and last over 3000 charge cycles.

== Commercialization and prices ==
Companies around the world develop commercially viable sodium-ion batteries, mainly in China. A 2-hour 5 MW/10 MWh grid battery was installed in China in 2023. By 2025, sodium-ion battery packs remained 30% more expensive than lithium iron phosphate (LFP) due to scaling. By 2026, the price premium was narrow in some cases.

A 2025 report from the International Renewable Energy Agency (IRENA) suggested that sodium-ion battery cell costs could drop to $40/kWh, while LFP fell as far as $70/kWh.

Energy storage manufacturer Pylontech obtained the first sodium-ion battery certificate (for safe commercial use) in 2023 from TÜV Rheinland.

=== Alsym Energy ===
Alsym Energy is a US-based developer of sodium-ion batteries, whose proprietary battery technology (Na-Series) is designed to avoid thermal runaway. As of mid-2026, Alsym has 18 GWh of announced commercial deployment agreements, including 9GWh with ERITY, 8.5 GWh with ESS, and 500MWh with Juniper Energy. Alsym plans on a domestic supply chain, and Juniper Energy cited the use of US-produced batteries as a way to maximize domestic-content tax incentives.

=== Altech ===
Australia's Altech is building a 120 MWh plant in Germany.

=== Altris AB ===
Altris AB was founded by Associate Professor Reza Younesi, his former PhD student, Ronnie Mogensen, and Associate Professor William Brant as a spin-off from Uppsala University, Sweden, launched in 2017 as part of research efforts from the team on sodium-ion batteries. The research was conducted at the Ångström Advanced Battery Centre led by Prof. Kristina Edström at Uppsala University. The company offers a proprietary iron-based Prussian blue analogue for the positive electrode in non-aqueous sodium-ion batteries that use hard carbon as the anode. Altris holds patents on non-flammable fluorine-free electrolytes consisting of NaBOB in alkyl-phosphate solvents, Prussian white cathode, and cell production. Clarios is partnering to produce batteries using Altris technology.

=== BASF/Mercedes ===
Germany invested €1.3 million in a sodium-ion project with BASF and Mercedes-Benz.

=== BYD ===
BYD in 2023 invested $1.4B USD into the construction of a sodium-ion battery plant in Xuzhou with an annual output of 30 GWh.

=== CATL ===
Chinese battery manufacturer CATL announced in 2021 that it would bring a sodium-ion based battery to market by 2023. It uses Prussian blue analogue for the positive electrode and porous carbon for the negative electrode. They claimed a specific energy density of 160 Wh/kg in their first generation battery. CATL, the world's biggest lithium-ion battery manufacturer, announced in 2022 the start of mass production of SIBs. Chery Automobile became their first customer in 2023.

In 2024, CATL unveiled the Freevoy hybrid chemistry battery pack for use in hybrid vehicles with a mix of sodium ion and lithium ion cells. This battery pack features an expected range of over 400 kilometres (250 mi), 4C fast charging capability, the ability to be discharged at −40 °C (−40 °F), and no difference to the driving experience at −20 °C (−4 °F). By 2025, around 30 different hybrid vehicle models are expected to be equipped with this pack.

In April 2025, CATL launched its Naxtra sodium-ion battery brand, with mass production planned for December. According to CATL, the energy density is 175 Wh/kg, approaching lithium iron phosphate (LFP) at 185 Wh/kg. It supports 5C charging and over 10,000 charge cycles, corresponding to about 5.8 million km, as opposed to 4,500 cycles for the best LFP batteries. It also performs well in extreme cold, retaining 93% capacity at −30 °C and supporting highway speeds at low charge levels. CATL claimed that the battery passed rigorous safety tests (e.g., compression, penetration) without fire or explosion risks. In September 2025, the Naxtra sodium-ion battery passed China's new national standard certification (GB 38031-2025), validating its rapid 15-minute fast-charging capability and safety across extreme temperatures for future EV integration.

=== Faradion Limited ===
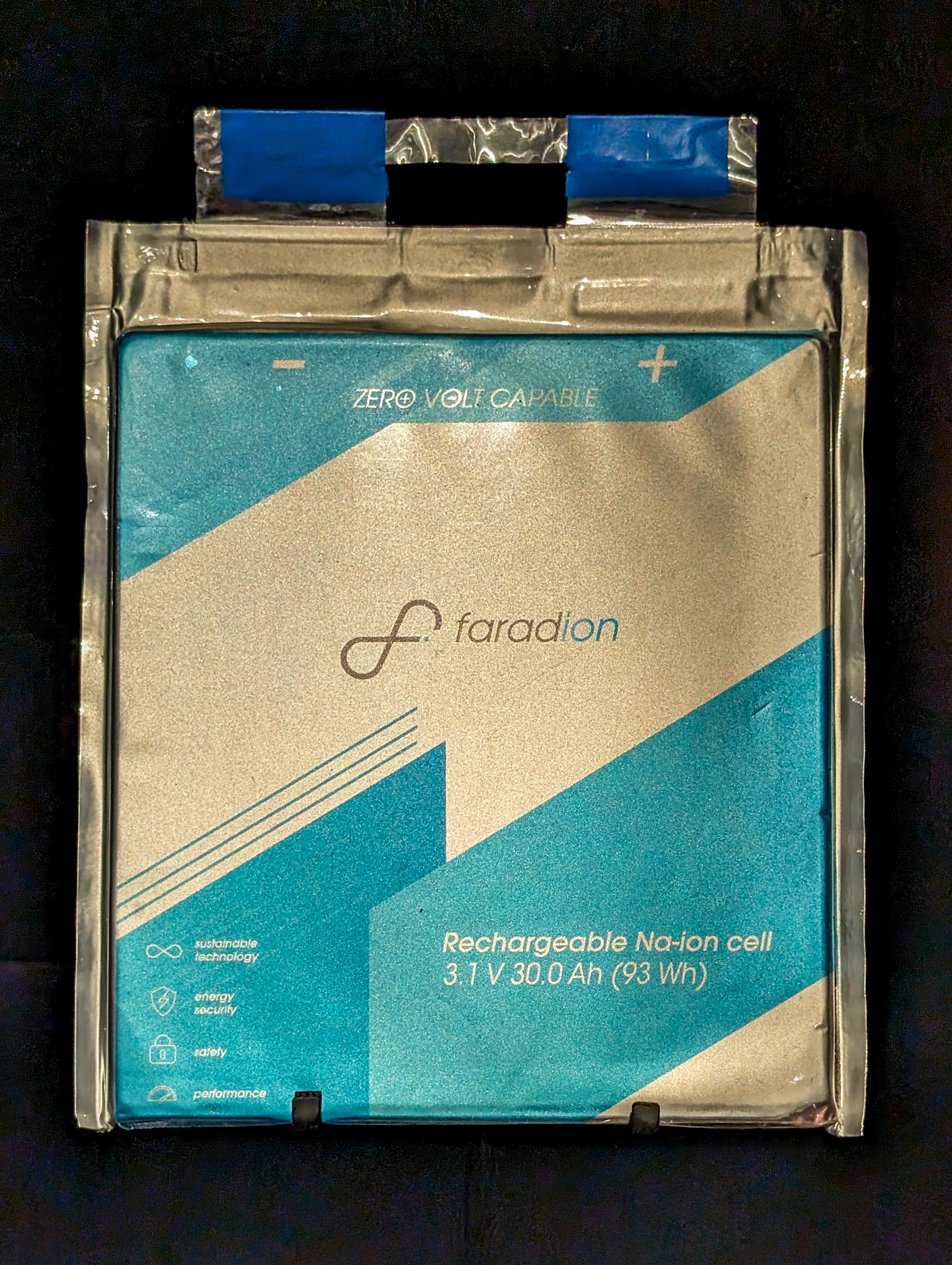
A Faradion sodium-ion battery manufactured in 2022

Faradion Limited is a subsidiary of India's Reliance Industries. Its cell design uses oxide cathodes with hard carbon anode and a liquid electrolyte. Their pouch cells have energy densities comparable to commercial Li-ion batteries (160 Wh/kg at cell-level), with good rate performance up to 3C, and cycle lives of 300 (100% depth of discharge) to over 1,000 cycles (80% depth of discharge). Its battery packs have demonstrated use for e-bike and e-scooter applications. They demonstrated transporting sodium-ion cells in the shorted state (at 0 V), eliminating risks from commercial transport of such cells. It is partnering with AMTE Power plc (formerly known as AGM Batteries Limited).

In November 2019, Faradion co-authored a report with Bridge India titled 'The Future of Clean Transportation: Sodium-ion Batteries' looking at the growing role India can play in manufacturing sodium-ion batteries.

On December 5, 2022, Faradion installed its first sodium-ion battery for Nation in New South Wales Australia.

=== Farasis Energy ===
Farasis Energy's JMEV EV3 (Youth Edition) produced the first serial-production A00-class electric vehicle equipped with sodium-ion batteries, with a 251 km range.

=== Freen ===
Estonia's Freen launched a 10 kWh residential sodium-ion battery for solar and wind integration.

=== General Motors and Peak Energy ===
In June 2026, General Motors (GM) and Peak Energy announced a partnership to develop and deploy sodium-ion battery systems for stationary grid-scale energy storage. GM would develop sodium-ion battery cells in Michigan, while Peak Energy would combine them with its battery-system technology.

=== HiNA Battery Technology Company ===
HiNa Battery Technology Co., Ltd is, a spin-off from the Chinese Academy of Sciences (CAS). It leverages research conducted by Prof. Hu Yong-sheng's group at the Institute of Physics at CAS. HiNa's batteries are based on Na-Fe-Mn-Cu based oxide cathodes and anthracite-based carbon anode. In February 2023, the Chinese HiNA placed a 140 Wh/kg sodium-ion battery in an electric test car for the first time, the Sehol E10X. HiNa also revealed three sodium-ion products, the NaCR32140-ME12 cylindrical cell, the NaCP50160118-ME80 square cell and the NaCP73174207-ME240 square cell, with gravimetric energy densities of 140 Wh/kg, 145 Wh/kg and 155 Wh/kg respectively. The cycle life of Hina's Battery was reported to by 4,500 cycles in 2022. The company's goals were increasing specific energy to 180-200 Wh/kg and the cycle life to 8,000-10,000 cycles. CATL and BYD also made similar statements around the same time.

In 2019, it was reported that HiNa installed a 100 kWh sodium-ion battery energy storage system in East China.

Chinese automaker Yiwei debuted the first sodium-ion battery-powered car in 2023. It uses JAC Group's UE module technology, which is similar to CATL's cell-to-pack design. The car has a 23.2 kWh battery pack with a CLTC range of 230 kilometres (140 mi).

=== Jungheinrich ===
In May 2026, Jungheinrich announced the beginning of field trials for sodium-ion battery technology in its industrial trucks, including its forklifts at selected customer sites, to test efficiency and viability in real world applications.

=== KPIT ===
On December, 2023 KPIT Technologies introduced India's first sodium-ion battery technology, marking a significant breakthrough in the country. This newly developed technology is predicted to reduce the cost of batteries for electric vehicles by 25–30%. It has been developed in cooperation with Pune's Indian Institute of Science Education and Research over the course of almost a decade and claims several notable benefits over existing alternatives such as lead-acid and lithium-ion. Among its standout features are a longer lifespan of 3,000–6,000 cycles, faster charging than traditional batteries, greater resistance to below-freezing temperatures and with varied energy densities between 100 and 170 Wh/Kg. KPIT Technologies and Trentar Energy Solutions to commercialize KPIT's proprietary sodium-ion battery technology, Trentar is investing in a 3 GWh manufacturing facility to produce these batteries.

=== SgNaPlus ===
SgNaPlus Pte. Ltd. is a spin-off company founded by Associate Professor Palani Balaya. It aims to commercialise novel non-flammable and highly reliable sodium-ion batteries, using designs created by the Alternative Energy Systems Laboratory at the College of Design and Engineering, National University of Singapore. SgNaPlus also has rights for the patent for a non-flammable sodium-ion batteries.

=== TIAMAT ===
TIAMAT spun off from the CNRS/CEA and a H2020 EU-project called NAIADES. Its technology focuses on the development of 18650-format cylindrical cells based on polyanionic materials. It achieved energy density between 100 Wh/kg to 120 Wh/kg. The technology targets applications in the fast charge and discharge markets. Power density is between 2 and 5 kW/kg, allowing for a 5 min charging time. Lifetime is 5000+ cycles to 80% of capacity.

They are responsible for one of the first commercialized product powered by Sodium-Ion battery technology, as of October 2023, through the commercialization of an electric screw-driver.

=== Rechargion Energy ===
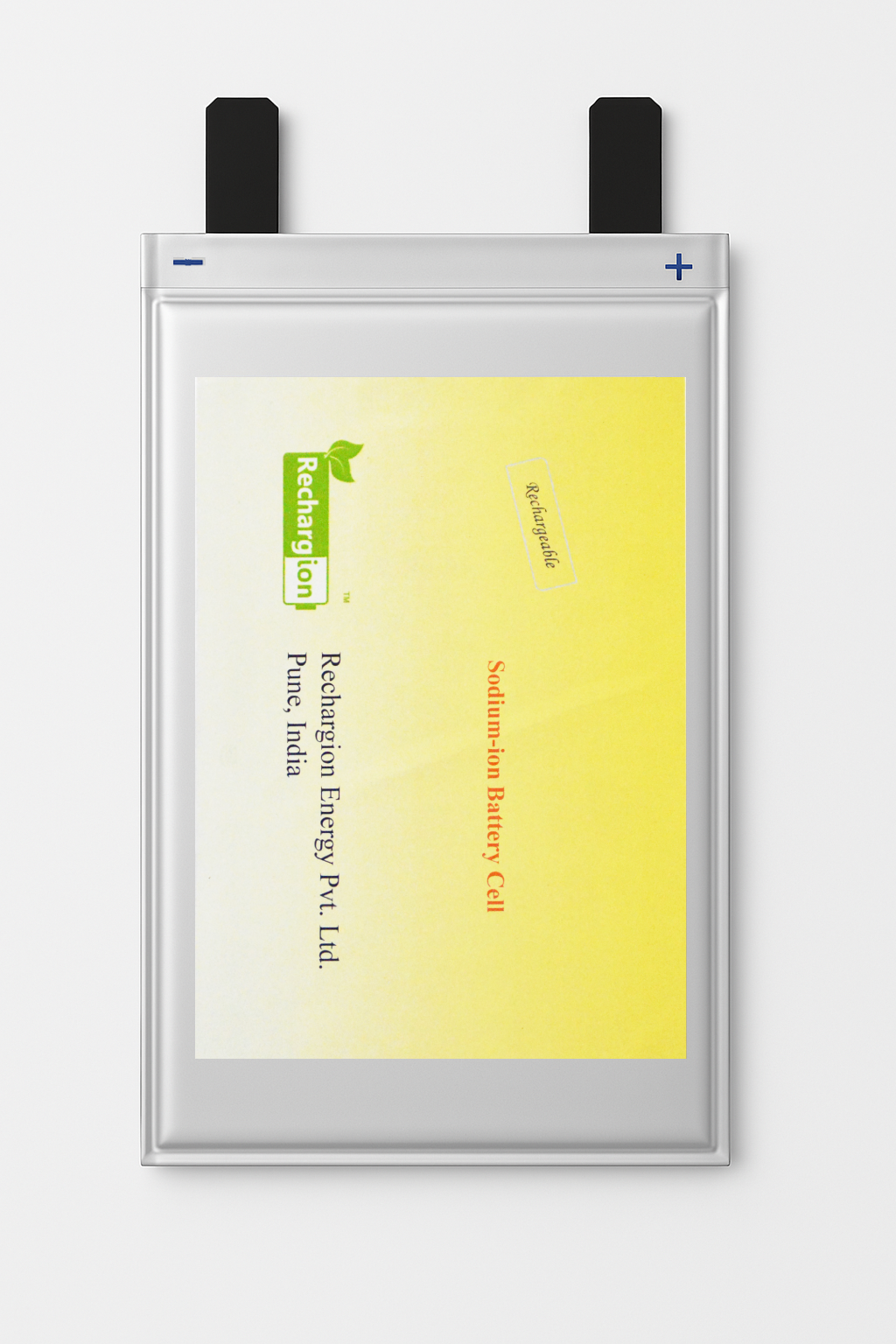
10Ah Sodium ion Pouch Cell from Rechargion

Rechargion Energy has developed 10 Ah capacity cells and achieved 10,000-cycle life. The cells were validated by the Automotive Research Association of India (ARAI) to comply IEC62660 safety standards after rigorous testing.

=== Others ===
In 2025, MOLL Batterien secured €22 million in funding for its Sodium-ion Battery manufacturing plant in Germany.

=== Former ===
Parts of the operation were acquired by other companies.

==== Northvolt ====
Northvolt, Europe's only large homegrown electric battery maker, said it has made a "breakthrough" sodium-ion battery. Northvolt said its new battery, which has an energy density of more than 160 watt-hours per kilogram, has been designed for "electricity storage plants" (grid energy storage) but could in future be used in electric vehicles, such as two wheeled scooters. The company filed for bankruptcy in November 2024, about 1 year after the announcement.

==== Natron Energy ====
Natron Energy, a spin-off from Stanford University, uses Prussian blue analogues for both cathode and anode with an aqueous electrolyte. Clarios is partnering to produce a battery using Natron technology. Natron opened a $40 million facility in Michigan in April 2024, aiming to achieve a 600 MW of annual production rate by the end of 2025. A $1.4 billion factory in North Carolina was planned to scale production 40-fold. Natron Energy ceased all operations as of September 3, 2025, citing funding challenges and issues with commercialization.

== Sodium metal rechargeable batteries ==
Types:

- Molten-sodium battery:
  - Sodium-sulfur battery (NaS).
  - Sodium-metal halide or Sodium-nickel chloride battery ($\ce{Na-NiCl2}$ or Zebra battery).
- Sodium-ion battery (NaIBs).

== Electric vehicles ==
CATL work with Li Auto, develops, manufactures, and sells premium smart EVs, will integrate these fast-charging sodium-ion batteries into upcoming EV models.

As of early 2026, CATL and Chinese EV manufacturer Changan Automobile plan on launching a sodium-ion EV in mid-2026, the Changan Nevo A06. The battery's power density is expected to be comparable to that of contemporary LFP batteries. Nevo A06 is featuring initially a 45 kWh sodium-ion battery (Naxtra).

In August 2026, a mining truck powered by sodium-ion batteries was delivered to Tangshan Sanyou mine in China. The vehicle is a joint research and development effort between Hina Battery and Tonly Heavy Industry.

== See also ==
- List of battery types
- Comparison of commercial battery types
- Alkali metal-ion batteries:
  - Lithium-ion battery – Type of rechargeable battery
  - Potassium-ion battery – Type of battery
- Alkaline earth metal-ion batteries:
  - Calcium-ion battery – Battery with a calcium electrode
- Rechargeable battery – Electric battery which can be recharged
- Solid-state battery – Battery with solid electrodes and a solid electrolyte and Semi-solid-state battery – Type of rechargeable battery
- Vehicle to grid – System for returning electricity to the grid
