= Viejas Casino & Resort =

Hotel casino

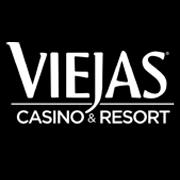

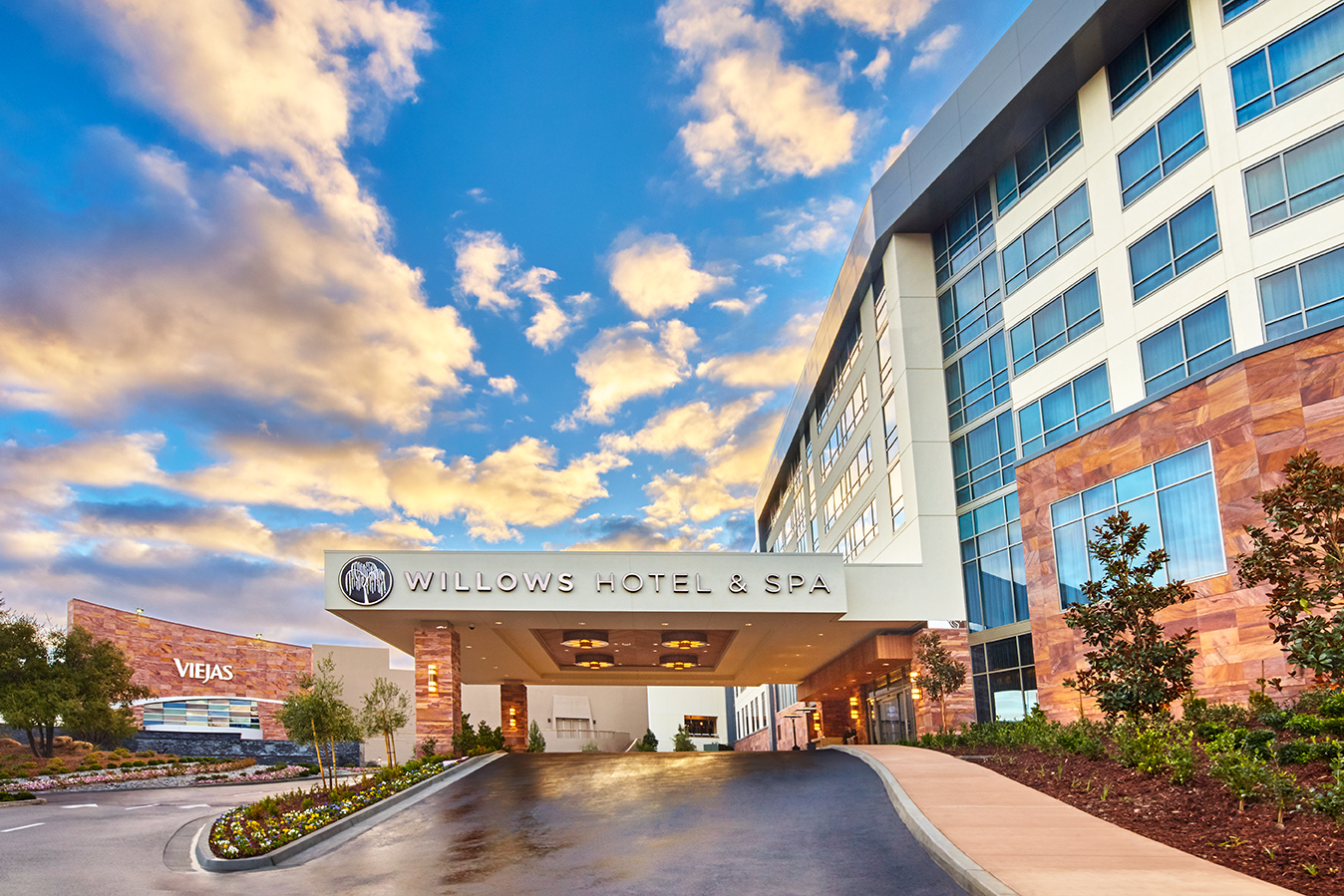
- Entrance to the Willows Hotel & Spa at Viejas Casino & Resort in Alpine, California

- Location within California
- Interactive map of Viejas Casino & Resort
- Location: Alpine, California; 5000 Willows Road; 32°50′32″N 116°42′20″W
- Opened: September 13, 1991
- No. of rooms: 397
- Gaming space: 133,000 sq ft (12,400 m^{2})
- Signature attractions: Casino resort Restaurants and dining Live entertainment and concert venue Viejas Outlets; Outdoor ice rink Bowling alley
- Notable restaurants: Grove Steakhouse; Baron Long Bar & Grill; Ginger Noodle House; The Daily Roast
- Casino type: Land-based
- Owner: Viejas Band of Kumeyaay Indians
- Renovated in: 1998; 2007; 2013; 2015; 2018; 2024
- Website: viejas.com

Viejas Casino & Resort is a luxury casino resort and outlet center owned and operated by the Viejas Band of Kumeyaay Indians, located in Alpine, California. The resort features over 2,000 slot machines offering a mix of new and traditional titles, a wide selection of table games including blackjack, craps, roulette, and baccarat, as well as bingo and an off-track betting facility. The gaming floor includes cocktail service and multiple bars throughout the property.

The resort offers multiple dining venues, including the AAA Four Diamond award-winning Grove Steakhouse, Baron Long Bar & Grill, Ginger Noodle House, The Daily Roast (serving Starbucks coffee), and additional casual and in-room dining options. Additional amenities include the myViejas Players Club loyalty program, live entertainment and concerts, and a variety of indoor and outdoor event spaces, including a ballroom, meeting rooms, and conference facilities.

The property also includes the Viejas Outlets, an open-air shopping mall featuring a range of internationally recognized retail brands, and the Willows Hotel & Spa, a boutique luxury hotel tower with a full-service spa and salon. The resort is home to one of the largest outdoor ice rinks in Southern California.

The hotel opened in March 2013 with 128 rooms. An expansion completed in October 2015 added a second tower with 109 rooms and suites. Subsequent expansions have increased total accommodations to 397 rooms, including the Willows Hotel & Spa.

== History ==
In 1932, the Viejas Band of Kumeyaay Indians purchased the reservation with their share of proceeds from a forced eviction from the area now containing El Capitan Reservoir. The Viejas tribe is one of five California tribes that signed a modified compact with Governor Arnold Schwarzenegger granting unlimited slot machines in return for higher payments to the state.

In 1977, the Viejas Bingo Room opened in the Ma Tar Awa RV Park on the Viejas reservation. Viejas Casino opened its doors on September 13, 1991. The bingo room was moved inside the casino from the RV resort in 1994. Six years later, a new bingo room was built east of the casino. In 2006, a $19 million project to remodel the casino was completed.

In 2007, the Viejas tribe announced an $800 million expansion project including a second casino, hotel, and parking garage. By 2015, Viejas Casino had a newly renovated non-smoking casino area, a 5-story parking garage, and an expanded hotel section. A poker room was added in early 2016 but was later removed. The addition of the new hotel, the Willows Hotel & Spa, was completed by February 2018. The new luxury hotel tower is for adults only (21+) and has 159 suites, a spa, fitness center, upscale dining options, and an expanded gaming area. The renovation also included a high-limit gaming area.

== Hotel ==
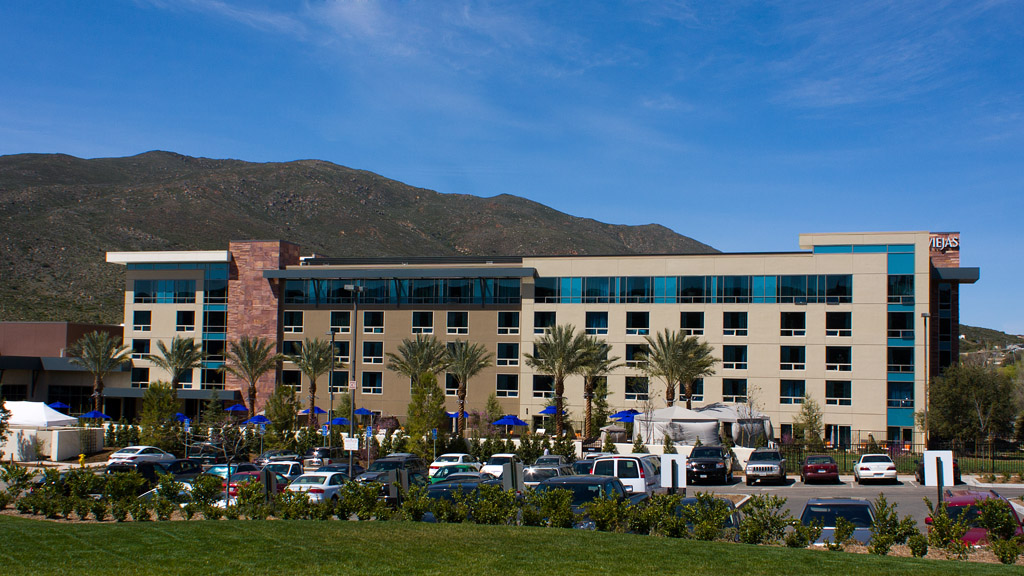
Viejas Hotel opened March 2013

On August 31, 2011, the Viejas tribe announced plans to add a 150-room luxury hotel to the casino. Plans were scaled back slightly resulting in a 5-story hotel with 128 rooms consisting of 99 deluxe rooms and 29 luxury suites. The $36 million project broke ground in early 2012 and the building was topped out in November 2012. Hotel construction was completed in March 2013 with the grand opening celebration held on March 21, 2013. Viejas describes the hotel as "modern amenities, streamlined design and handcrafted, boutique feel". The original hotel includes a business center, fitness center, and resort style pool with VIP cabanas.

As part of the original hotel construction project both east and west entrances to the casino were remodeled and valet parking was moved from the east entrance to the west entrance. Additional valet parking was made available at the hotel entrance when the hotel opened. Bingo was moved into a new 340-seat bingo hall inside the casino and the former bingo hall was razed to make room for the hotel. The east entrance was enlarged and extended to connect the hotel to the casino and the buffet was remodeled and expanded. The buffet is the only restaurant that allows children and persons under the age of 21. Those under 21 are not permitted anywhere else in the casino.

With the hotel opening, Viejas was renamed to Viejas Casino & Resort. Since its opening in 2013, Viejas Casino & Resort has received the AAA Four Diamond Award consecutively each year.

In February 2013 a Tribal Environmental Impact Report was filed for construction of a 6-story parking structure with capacity for up to 1,000 vehicles to be built on the north side of the casino. The parking garage would provide additional parking for both the casino and hotel. Construction was started in April 2013 and the parking structure opened on November 21, 2013.

In 2014, the casino underwent a year-long development project to include a 15,000 square foot expansion of their gaming floor, an additional five-story hotel tower and renovated non-smoking casino areas.

The extended casino floor allowed for the addition of another 1,000 slot machines, while the new hotel tower increased accommodations. This expansion created an additional 50,000 square feet of indoor and outdoor multifunction resort space, and increased hotel accommodations to a total of 237 rooms and suites.

In 2016, Viejas Casino & Resort began another development project with the construction of a third hotel tower named the Willows Hotel & Spa. It is open to guests age 21 and older and has 159 suites, a saltwater pool, two new restaurants, outdoor dining and a day spa and salon. IGroup Design was the Lead Design Architect on the 225,000 square foot addition. The project was completed and unveiled January 2018. The Willows was an award-winning hospitality project.

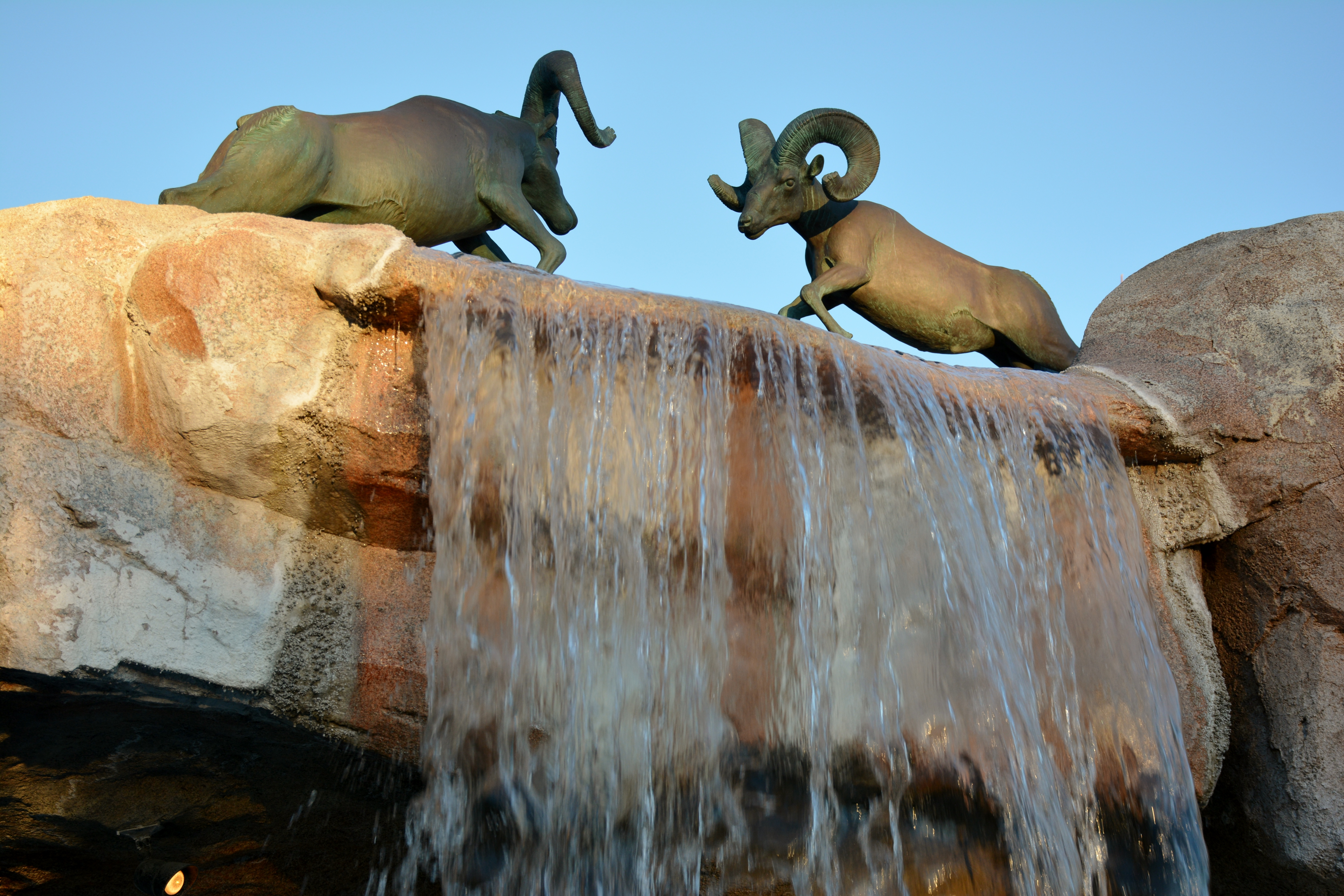
Waterfall outside the hotel

A 410-stall charging station and the hotel facilities are served by 15 MW solar panels (including a car park) and 60 MWh aqueous zinc batteries and 10 MWh vanadium flow batteries. This microgrid is partly funded with a $72.8 million loan package from the United States Department of Energy Loan Programs Office, and $43.3 million from the California Energy Commission. The charging station project was announced in 2023 by the builder, EVPassport.

== See also ==
- Viejas Arena - formerly known as Cox Arena, the on-campus arena of San Diego State University (SDSU)
- Kumeyaay
