= Potassium-ion battery =

Type of battery

A potassium-ion battery or K-ion battery (abbreviated as KIB) is a type of battery and analogue to lithium-ion batteries, using potassium ions for charge transfer instead of lithium ions.

It was invented by the Iranian/American chemist Ali Eftekhari (President of the American Nano Society) in 2004.

== History ==
The prototype device used a potassium anode and a Prussian blue compound as the cathode material for its high electrochemical stability. The prototype was successfully used for more than 500 cycles. A recent review showed currently that several pragmatic materials have been successfully used as the anode and cathode for the new generations of potassium-ion batteries. For example, the conventional anode material graphite has been shown that it can be used as an anode in a potassium-ion battery.

In 2024, Group1, created Kristonite for the cathode.

== Materials ==
After the invention of potassium-ion battery with the prototype device, researchers have increasingly been focusing on enhancing the specific capacity and cycling performance with the application of new materials to electrodes (anode and cathode) and electrolyte.

A general picture of the material used for potassium-ion battery can be found as follows:

=== Cathodes ===
Besides the original Prussian blue cathode and its analogs, researches on cathode part of potassium ion battery focus on engineering.

Kristonite is a 4V cathode material — in the class of potassium prussian white (KPW) materials.

Another nanostructure and solid ionics appeared. A series of potassium transition metal oxide such as K_{0.3}MnO_{2}, K_{0.55}CoO_{2} have been demonstrated as cathode material with a layered structure. Polyanionic compounds with inductive defects could provide the highest working voltage among other types of cathode for potassium-ion batteries. During the electrochemical cycling process, its crystal structure will be distorted to created more induced defects upon the insertion of potassium ion. Recham et al first demonstrated that fluorosulfates have a reversible intercalation mechanism with K, Na and Li, since then, other polyanionic compound such as K_{3}V_{2}(PO_{4})_{3}, KVPO_{4}F have been studied, while still limited to the complex synthesis process. Worth noting is an orthodox approach of using organic compound as cathode for potassium-ion battery, such as PTCDA, a red pigment which can bond with 11 potassium ion within single molecule. Classic alloying anodes such as Si, Sb and Sn that can form alloy with lithium ion during cycling process are also applicable for potassium-ion battery. Among them Sb is the most promising candidate due to its low cost and the theoretical capacity up to 660 mAh g^{−1}. Other organic compounds are also being developed to achieve strong mechanical strength as well as maintaining decent performance.

=== Anodes ===
Same as the case of lithium-ion battery, graphite could also accommodate the intercalation of potassium within electrochemical process. Whereas with different kinetics, graphite anodes suffer from low capacity retention during cycling within potassium-ion batteries. Thus, the approach of structure engineering of graphite anode is needed to achieve stable performance. Other types of carbonaceous materials besides graphite have been employed as anode material for potassium-ion battery, such as expanded graphite, carbon nanotubes, carbon nanofibers and also nitrogen or phosphorus-doped carbon materials. Conversion anodes which can form compound with potassium ion with boosted storage capacity and reversibility have also been studied to fit for potassium-ion battery. To buffer the volume change of conversion anode, a carbon material matrix is always applied such as MoS_{2}@rGO, Sb_{2}S_{3}-SNG, SnS_{2}-rGO and so on.

=== Electrolytes ===
Because the chemical activity of potassium is higher, potassium ion batteries place higher demands on the electrolyte, and developing suitable electrolytes has proven challenging. Commercial ethylene carbonate (EC), diethyl carbonate (DEC) and similar traditional ether/ester liquid electrolytes show poor cycling performance and rapid capacity degradation due to the Lewis acidity of potassium. These electrolytes are also highly flammable, presenting safety hazards, and research has turned towards other electrolyte materials. Ionic liquid electrolytes offer the possibility of wide electrochemical window and without flammability and have been studied with the potassium ion battery, achieving improved stability, particularly with a graphite anode. Recently, solid polymer electrolyte for all-solid-state potassium-ion battery have attracted much attention due to its flexibility and enhanced safety, Feng et al proposed a poly (propylene carbonate)-KFSI solid polymer electrolyte with the frame work of cellulose non-woven membrane, with boosted ionic conductivity of 1.36$\times$10^{−5} S cm^{−1}. Research on electrolyte for potassium-ion battery is focusing on achieving fast ion diffusion kinetics, stable SEI formation as well as enhanced safety.

== Advantages ==
Along with the sodium ion, potassium-ion is the prime chemistry replacement candidate for lithium-ion batteries. The potassium-ion has certain advantages over similar lithium-ion (e.g., lithium-ion batteries): the cell design is simple and both the material and the fabrication procedures are cheaper. The key advantage is the abundance and low cost of potassium in comparison with lithium, which makes potassium batteries a promising candidate for large scale batteries such as household energy storage and electric vehicles. Another advantage of a potassium-ion battery over a lithium-ion battery is potentially faster charging.

The prototype employed a KBF_{4} electrolyte, though almost all common electrolyte salts can be used. In addition, ionic liquids have also recently been reported as stable electrolytes with a wide electrochemical window. The chemical diffusion coefficient of K^{+} in the cell is higher than that of Li^{+} in lithium batteries, due to a smaller Stokes radius of solvated K^{+}. Since the electrochemical potential of K^{+} is identical to that of Li^{+}, the cell potential is similar to that of lithium-ion. Potassium batteries can accept a wide range of cathode materials which can offer rechargeability lower cost. One noticeable advantage is the availability of potassium graphite, which is used as an anode material in some lithium-ion batteries. Its stable structure guarantees a reversible intercalation/de-intercalation of potassium ions under charge/discharge.

== Applications ==
In 2005, a potassium battery that uses molten electrolyte of KPF_{6} was patented. In 2007, Chinese company Starsway Electronics marketed the first potassium battery-powered portable media player as a high-energy device.

Potassium batteries have been proposed for large-scale energy storage given its exceptional cyclability, but current prototypes only withstand a hundred charging cycles.

As of 2019, five main issues are preventing widespread use of the K-ion battery technology: low diffusion of potassium ions through a solid electrode, as well as breakdown of the potassium after repeated cycles due to changes in volume, side reactions, growth of dendrites and poor heat dissipation. Researchers estimate that it could take as long as 20 years to figure all these problems out.

== Biological potassium battery ==
The interesting and unique feature of the potassium-ion battery in comparison with other types of batteries is that life on Earth is based on biological potassium-ion batteries. K^{+} is the key charge carrier in plants. Circulation of K^{+} ions facilitates energy storage in plants by forming decentralized potassium batteries. This is not only an iconic feature of potassium-ion batteries but also indicates how important it is to understand the role of K^{+} charge carriers to understand the living mechanism of plants.

== Other potassium batteries ==
Researchers demonstrated a potassium-air battery (K-O_{2}) with low overpotential. Its charge/discharge potential gap of about 50 mV is the lowest reported value in metal−air batteries. This provides a round-trip energy efficiency of >95%. In comparison, lithium–air batteries (Li-O_{2}) have a much higher overpotential of 1–1.5 V, which results in 60% round-trip efficiency.

== See also ==
- List of battery types
- Lithium–air battery
- Thin film lithium-ion battery
- Alkali metal-ion battery
  - Lithium-ion battery
  - Sodium-ion battery
  - Potassium-ion battery
  - Calcium-ion battery
