= Dual carbon battery =

Carbon Ion batteries

A dual carbon battery is a type of battery that uses graphite (or carbon) as both its cathode and anode material. Compared to lithium-ion batteries, dual-ion batteries (DIBs) require less energy and emit less CO_{2} during production, have a reduced reliance on critical materials such as Ni or Co, and are more easily recyclable.

== History ==
Dual-carbon (also called dual-graphite) batteries were first introduced in a 1989 patent. They were later studied by various other research groups.

In 2014, start-up Power Japan Plus announced plans to commercialize its version, named the Ryden. Dual Carbon Battery Technology has been developed by joint research between Power Japan Plus Inc. and Dr. Tatsumi Ishihara, professor of Kyushu University. Power Japan Plus completed development of a proof of concept of Organic Dual Carbon Battery as coin cells in 2014.

Co-lead Kaname Takeya is known for his work on the Toyota Prius and Tesla Model S. The company claimed that its cell offers energy density comparable to a lithium-ion battery, charges 20 times faster than conventional lithium-ion batteries, is rated for more than 3,000 cycles, improved safety and cradle-to-cradle sustainability. It also claimed that its battery can slot directly into existing manufacturing processes, without changes to existing manufacturing lines.

In June 2017, PJP Eye LTD. acquired Power Japan Plus's battery business and all of its R&D facility and equipment, intellectual property and patents, and other assets.

Currently, PJP Eye LTD. continues development of Organic Dual Carbon Battery and completed proof of concept of the battery as laminated cells. PJP Eye has mass-produced Organic Single Carbon Battery based on Organic Dual Carbon Technology in 2017. It has been integrated into various applications from personal mobilities, drones to storages. PJP Eye LTD. plans to mass-produce and start commercialization of Organic Dual Carbon Battery which brand name is "Cambrian Dual" by 2023 to integrated them into EVs and electric airplanes.

As an electrolyte, the cell uses one or more lithium salts in an aprotic organic solvent. These remain unspecified, but as an example in a patent, the group uses a system consisting of lithium hexafluorophosphate (LiPF_{6}) as the salt, and ethylene carbonate (EC) and dimethyl carbonate (DMC), mixed in a 1:2 volume ratio, as solvent.

Both electrodes are based on graphitic carbon. Graphite with the right grain size is obtained by pyrolyzing cotton.

Precipitation and dissolution of a lithium salt takes place at any location where the electrolyte is present. However, increased precipitation on electrode surfaces decreases power density because the salt in a solid state is an insulator. One element of the company's patent introduces a method to prevent such precipitation. This also improves the battery's specific energy.

The battery can fully discharge without the risk of short-circuiting and damaging the battery. The battery operates without heating at room temperature, avoiding the extensive cooling systems that appear in current electric cars and the corresponding risk of thermal runaway. It operates at over four volts. The battery is fully recyclable. The electrodes are made from cotton, to better control the crystal size.

A separate research project used the same salt and a high voltage aprotic electrolyte based on a fluorinated solvent and additive, which was capable of supporting the chemistry at 5.2 V with high efficiency. Enough electrolyte salt is needed in the cell to guarantee conductivity, and enough solvent must be available to enable the salt to dissolve at any level of charge/discharge.

== Mode of operation ==
Lithium ions dispersed in the electrolyte are inserted/deposited into/on the anode during charge, as in other lithium-ion batteries. Unusually, ions (anions) from the electrolyte are intercalated into the cathode at the same time. During discharge, both anions and lithium ions return to the electrolyte. The electrolyte in such a system thus acts as both charge carrier and active material.

Capacity is determined by the storage capacity and amount of ion release of the electrodes and the amount of anions and cations in the aprotic electrolyte.

=== Reactions ===
In the following equations, → is the charging reaction and ← is the discharging reaction.

Positive electrode:

PF^{−}_{6} + n C ⇄ C_{n}(PF_{6}) + e^{−}

Negative electrode:

Li^{+} + n C + e^{−} ⇄ LiC_{n}

== Patents ==
- Patent A US 3844837 A; basic concept, awarded to U.S. Navy on 29 Oct 1974
- Patent A1 WO 2015132962 A1; commercially viable chemistry, awarded to Kyushu University and Power Japan Plus on 11 Sep 2015
- Patent A1 WO 2016021067 A1; construction technique, awarded to Power Japan Plus on 11 Feb 2016
- Patent A1 WO 2016021068 A1; fabrication technique, awarded to Power Japan Plus on 11 Feb 2016
- Patent A1 WO 2016046910 A1; medical application arising from their carbon research, awarded to Power Japan Plus on 31 Mar 2016
- Patent A JP 2016091984 A; dendrite growth problem solved, awarded to Power Japan Plus on 23 May 2016
