= Kristina Edström =

Swedish inorganic chemist

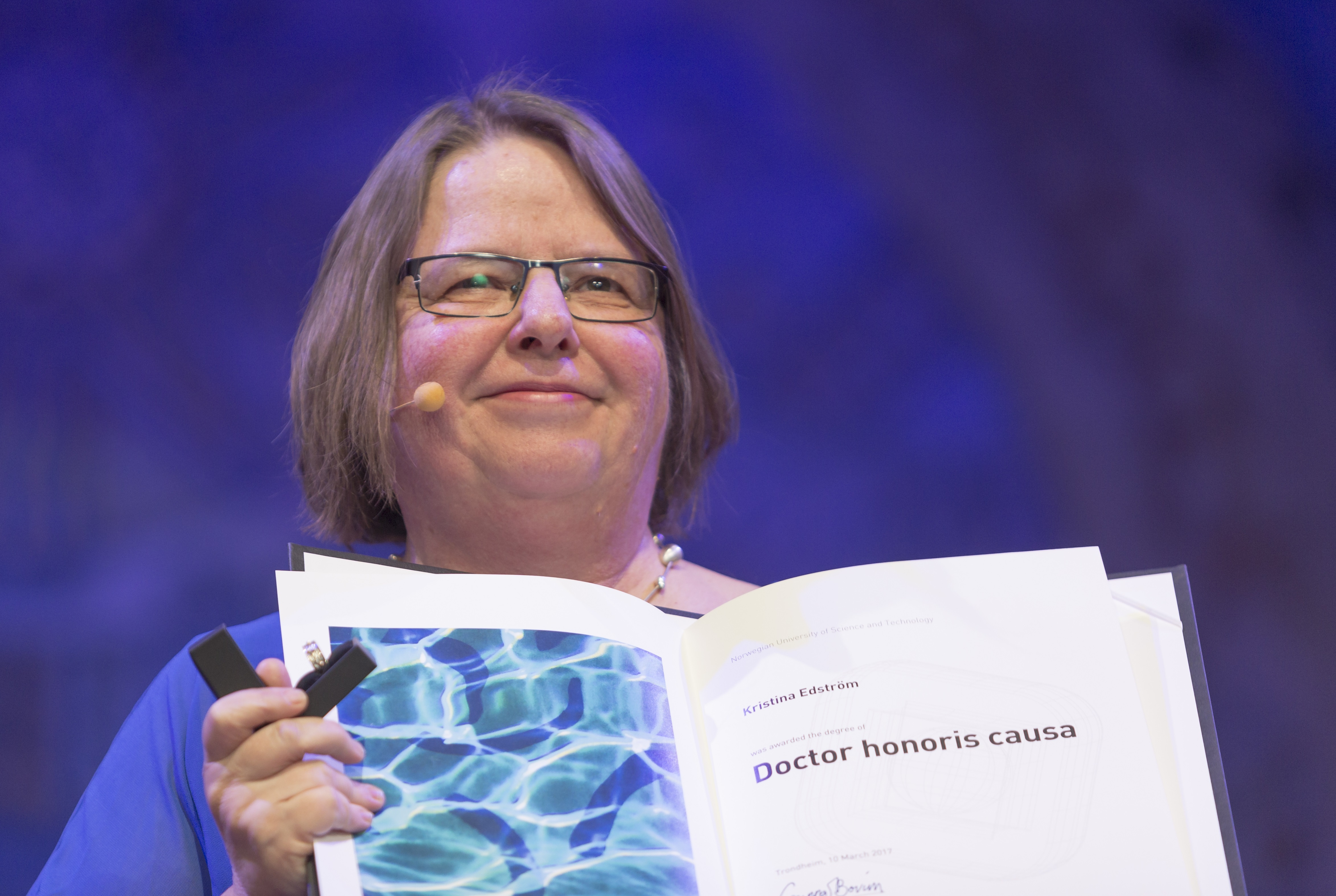
- Born: 2 June 1958 (age 68); Gothenburg, Sweden
- Education: Uppsala University
- Known for: Battery materials
- Scientific career
- Workplaces: Uppsala University
- Thesis: Diffraction as a tool in the study of solids ionic conductivity mechanisms (1990)

Kristina Edström (born 2 June 1958) is a Swedish Professor of Inorganic Chemistry at Uppsala University. She also serves as Head of the Ångström Advanced Battery Centre (ÅABC) and has previously been both Vice Dean for Research at the Faculty of Science and Technology and Chair of the STandUp for Energy research programme.

== Early life and education ==
Edström was born 1958 in Gothenburg. She studied chemistry at Uppsala University and earned her doctoral degree in 1990. For her doctoral research, Edström worked with Josh Thomas on solid electrolytes, including beta-alumina. She was appointed as research assistant at Uppsala University in 1995. At the time, she was interested in designing materials with special properties. Edström has earned a number of large research projects from funding agencies such as the Swedish Research Council, the Swedish Energy Agency, and the Knut and Alice Wallenberg foundation

== Research and career ==
Edström works on batteries and novel electrode materials. She has worked on lithium-ion, lithium–air and sodium-ion batteries. Her research has particularly considered new anode materials, using photoemission spectroscopy to identify the impact of interlayers and interfaces.

When rechargeable batteries are charged and discharged, they lose a little of their capacity. This degradation could because by crystals that form at the electrodes. Edström's recent work has considered self-repairing batteries using polymers. Polymers can form weak hydrogen bonds with other polymer chains or the surfaces of electrodes. Edström has proposed using polymers on the surface of electrodes in an effort to stop them from cracking. She has synthesised a range of polymers and investigated them using spectroscopic electrochemistry, as well as modelling the interfaces between the electrode and electrolyte. The electrolytes used by Edström include fixed ceramic and salt-based electrolytes. She is interested in battery technologies for the automotive industry.

She leads the Ångström Advanced Battery Centre at Uppsala University, which is the largest group in all of the Nordic countries. She is leading the Swedish battery competence center BASE and European Commission project, the EU Large-Scale Research Initiative BATTERY 2030+, that is developing next generation energy storage materials.

=== Academic service ===
Edström was promoted to Professor at Uppsala University in 2005. She has served as Vice Dean for Research at the Faculty of Science and Technology, and Vice Chancellor of the Degree Program. Alongside her research, Edström is involved with mentoring and teaching early career researchers. She has said that "I’m like an umbrella with different groupings of researchers, who all seek and receive their own research grants. It’s fun to see doctoral students take the leap...They make faster progress in their own area than I can. It’s so cool!”.

From 2010 to 2017 Edström served as Chair of the STandUp for Energy research programme. The programme includes KTH Royal Institute of Technology, Luleå University of Technology and the Swedish University of Agricultural Sciences. From 2016 to 2021 Edström is Director of SwedNess, a graduate programme in neutron scattering. She has been a member of the boards of Uppsala University, the Swedish Foundation for Strategic Research and currently she is a trustee of the Faraday Initiative and a vice preses of The Royal Academy of Engineering Science.

She is an elected member of the Royal Swedish Academy of Sciences and the Royal Swedish Academy of Engineering Sciences.

=== Awards and honours ===
- 2001 Luttemans scholarship
- 2002 Royal Swedish Academy of Sciences Benzelius Prize
- 2008 The Thuréus Prize
- 2011 Uppsala University Gold Medal
- 2017 Norwegian University of Science and Technology Honorary Doctorate
- 2018 KTH Great Prize
- 2019 Uppsala University Rudbeck Medal
- 2019 Wallenberg Scholar
- 2020 The Gustaf Adolf Medal in Gold from Uppsala University
- 2020 The Royal Academy of Science Gold Medal
- 2021 The honorary gold medal of the Uppsala municipality
- 2023 The IBA Yeager Award for "Pioneering Approaches in Surface and Bulk Characterization Methods Applied to Batteries".
- 2023 The Bror Holmberg medal in gold from the Swedish Chemical Society
- 2024 The European Battery Start Award from the European Battery Partnership BEPA.

=== Selected publications ===
K Luo, MR Roberts, R Hao, N Guerrini, DM Pickup, YS Liu, K Edström, Jinghua Guo, Alan V Chadwick, Laurent C Duda, Peter G Bruce; Charge-compensation in 3d-transition-metal-oxide intercalation cathodes through the generation of localized electron holes on oxygen, Nature chemistry 8 (7), 684 20 2016. https://doi.org/10.1038/nchem.2471

- K. Edström, T. Gustafsson, J. Thomas; The cathode–electrolyte interface in the Li-ion battery, Electrochimica Acta, 337–364, 2004. doi:10.1016/j.electacta.2004.03.049
- D. Larcher, S. Beattie, M. Morcrette, K. Edström, J.-C. Jumas, J.-M. Tarascon; Recent findings and prospects in the field of pure metals as negative electrodes for Li-ion batteries; Journal of Materials Chemistry, 3759-3772 (17), 2007. doi:10.1039/b705421c
- K. Edström, M. Herstedt, D.P. Abraham; A new look at the solid electrolyte interphase on graphite anodes in Li-ion batteries; Journal of Power Sources, 380-384 (153), 2006. doi:10.1016/j.jpowsour.2005.05.062
- A.M. Andersson, K. Edström; Chemical composition and morphology of the elevated temperature SEI on graphite; Journal of The Electrochemical Society, A1100-A1109 (148), 2001. doi:10.1149/1.1397771
- R Younesi, GM Veith, P Johansson, K Edström, T Vegge; Lithium salts for advanced lithium batteries: Li–metal, Li–O 2, and Li–S. Energy & Environmental Science 8 (7), 1905-1922, 2015. DOI: 10.1039/C5EE01215E
- B. Philippe, R. Dedryvère, J. Allouche, F. Lindgren, M. Gorgoi, H. Rensmo, D. Gonbeau, K. Edström; Nanosilicon electrodes for lithium-ion batteries: interfacial mechanisms studied by hard and soft X-ray photoelectron spectroscopy; Chemistry of Materials, 1107-1115 (24), 2012. doi:10.1021/cm2034195
- C Xu, F Lindgren, B Philippe, M Gorgoi, F Björefors, K Edström, T. Gustafsson; Improved performance of the silicon anode for Li-ion batteries: understanding the surface modification mechanism of fluoroethylene carbonate as an effective electrolyte additive, Chemistry of Materials 27 (7), 2591-2599, 2015. https://doi.org/10.1021/acs.chemmater.5b00339
- M Armand, P Axmann, D Bresser, M Copley, K Edström, C Ekberg, ...et al.:Lithium-ion batteries–Current state of the art and anticipated developments Journal of Power Sources 479, 228708. 2020.
- S Malmgren, K Ciosek, M Hahlin, T Gustafsson, M Gorgoi, H Rensmo, K. Edström: Comparing anode and cathode electrode/electrolyte interface composition and morphology using soft and hard X-ray photoelectron spectroscopy. Electrochimica Acta 97, 23-32 (2013)
- H. Bryngelsson, M. Stjerndahl, T. Gustafsson, K. Edström; How dynamic is the SEI?; Journal of Power Sources, 970-975 (174) 2007. doi:10.1016/j.jpowsour.2007.06.050
- A.M. Andersson, A. Henningson, H. Siegbahn, U. Jansson, K. Edström; Electrochemically lithiated graphite characterised by photoelectron spectroscopy; Journal of Power Sources, 522-527 (119) 2003. doi:10.1016/S0378-7753(03)00277-5
