= Natron Energy =

American sodium-ion battery manufacturer

- Type: Private
- Industry: Energy storage, electronics
- Founded: 2012; 14 years ago
- Founder: Colin Wessells
- Defunct: September 3, 2025
- Headquarters: Santa Clara, California, United States
- Key people: Wendell Brooks (CEO)
- Products: Sodium-ion batteries
- Website: Official website at the Wayback Machine (archived September 2, 2025)

Natron Energy was a company specializing in the development and production of sodium-ion batteries for energy storage applications, such as data centers and industrial systems. They were based in Santa Clara, California, with manufacturing facilities in Holland, Michigan. Founded in 2012, Natron was the first U.S. company to commercially produce sodium-ion batteries, beginning manufacturing in Holland, Michigan, in 2024.

The company ceased operations in September 2025.

== History ==
Natron Energy was founded in 2012 by Colin Wessells, then a Ph.D. student at Stanford University, to develop sodium-ion batteries as a cost-effective, sustainable alternative to lithium-ion batteries. In 2020, Natron's sodium-ion battery became the first to meet the UL 1973 safety standard for energy storage systems, enabling commercial deployment in data centers. The company began commercial production at its facility in Holland, Michigan, in May 2024, targeting applications in telecommunications, data centers, and industrial power systems.

In August 2024, Natron announced plans for a $1.4 billion gigafactory in Edgecombe County, North Carolina, expected to create 1,000 jobs and produce 24 gigawatt-hours of sodium-ion batteries annually by 2028. The project was supported by federal incentives under the 2022 Inflation Reduction Act.

On September 3, 2025, the company informed labor officials that they were permanently ceasing operations, citing lack of funding.

== Technology ==
Natron Energy's sodium-ion battery design uses Prussian blue electrodes, offering advantages over lithium-ion batteries, including lower cost, abundant raw materials, and enhanced safety. The company's BluePack Critical Power Battery is designed for rapid charging (full charge in 15 minutes) and durability (over 50,000 deep discharge cycles), making it suitable for high-power applications like data centers and microgrids. Unlike lithium-ion batteries, sodium-ion batteries do not rely on scarce materials like cobalt or lithium, reducing supply chain risks.

== Funding ==
As of September 2024, Natron Energy had raised approximately $200 million in funding from investors, including Chevron Technology Ventures, United Airlines Ventures, and Aramco Ventures. The company also received grants from the U.S. Department of Energy’s Advanced Research Projects Agency-Energy (ARPA-E) to support research and scale-up efforts.
