= Aqueous battery =

Type of electric battery

An aqueous battery is an electric battery that uses a water-based solution as an electrolyte. Aqueous batteries have existed since the 1860s. While most designs do not have the energy density and cycle life required by typical use cases (grid storage and electric vehicles), they are generally considered safer, more reliable and relatively inexpensive in comparison to lithium-ion batteries. Until the 2010s, aqueous batteries also found a niche in high-power applications like cordless power tools, but developments in Li-ion chemistry enabled Li-ion batteries to replace them.

== Commercial history ==
The lead–acid battery was invented by Gaston Planté in 1859, although the commercialization of the diluted sulphuric acid electrolyte design took twenty years of work by multiple inventors. After an additional half a century the modern valve-regulated ("sealed") batteries appeared in 1930s.

Alkaline batteries first appeared at the turn of the 20th century with nickel–cadmium battery replaced by nickel–metal hydride one in the 1980s (the nickel–hydrogen battery was developed in the 1970s and is still used in the satellites).

In the early 2020s the aqueous batteries comprised half of the market for rechargeable batteries.

== Advantages ==
When compared to the lithium-ion batteries, the aqueous ones have the following advantages:

- safety and reliability is related to non-flammability (due to high water content; battery can still explode if overheated), high tolerance against mechanical mishandling, and resistance to overcharging (due to the oxygen cycle);
- low cost is based on cheap raw materials (sulphuric acid is very inexpensive compared to, say, lithium hexafluorophosphate), manufacturing that does not require oxygen-free environments, minimum of electronics due to inherent safety and reliability;
- fast reaction rate allows faster charging and discharging and provides consistency over the temperature range.

== Disadvantages ==
In comparison to the lithium-ion batteries have the following drawbacks:

- a narrow electrochemical window: water starts electrolysing at the potential of 1.23 volts. Although a clever choice of materials can stretch the window to 2.3 V and utilizing a high-concentration electrolyte (so called water-in-salt electrolyte) can widen the window to 3 V, in practice only the lead-acid batteries reach 2 V, with the rest of the designs in production limited to the potential slightly above 1 V, thus greatly limiting the energy density (Li-ion cells typically deliver 3.3–3.9 V). Both volumetric and mass energy densities of the lithium-ion batteries are 2-3 times better;
- water being an aggressive solvent causes solvation and dissociation of battery components and can cause corrosion, limiting the choice of materials and lifetime of the battery;
- cycle life is an order of magnitude lower.

== Research ==
The aqueous batteries are subject to an extensive research in the 21st century (with an "astounding" increase in publications since 2015); the material innovations since the beginning of the century allow better performance that that of the "traditional" aqueous batteries might lead to these batteries evolving into a companion to the lithium-ion ones in the fields of transportation and electricity storage.

Tahir et al. identify the following directions of research:

- lithium-ion aqueous battery (LIAB). The first prototype was produced in 1994;
- sodium-ion aqueous battery (SIAB);
- potassium-ion aqueous battery (PIAB);
- zinc-ion aqueous battery (ZIAB);
- magnesium-ion aqueous battery (MIAB);
- aluminum-ion aqueous battery (AIAB).

== Sources ==
- Liang, Yanliang; Yao, Yan (15 November 2022). "Designing modern aqueous batteries". Nature Reviews Materials. 8 (2): 109–122. doi:10.1038/s41578-022-00511-3. eISSN 2058-8437.
- Chao, Dongliang; Zhou, Wanhai; Xie, Fangxi; Ye, Chao; Li, Huan; Jaroniec, Mietek; Qiao, Shi-Zhang (22 May 2020). "Roadmap for advanced aqueous batteries: From design of materials to applications". Science Advances. 6 (21) eaba4098. Bibcode:2020SciA....6.4098C. doi:10.1126/sciadv.aba4098. eISSN 2375-2548. PMC 7244306. PMID 32494749.
- Tahir, Chenar A.; Agarwal, Charu; Csóka, Levente (13 April 2020). "Advances in "Green" Ion-Batteries Using Aqueous Electrolytes". Rechargeable Batteries: History, Progress, and Applications. Wiley. pp. 379–401. doi:10.1002/9781119714774.ch16. ISBN 978-1-119-66119-1.
- Pistola, G. (20 May 2013). "Portable Devices: Batteries". In Jürgen Garche; Chris K. Dyer; Patrick T. Moseley; Zempachi Ogumi; David A. J. Rand; Bruno Scrosati (eds.). Encyclopedia of Electrochemical Power Sources. Newnes. p. 33. ISBN 978-0-444-52745-5. OCLC 1136567377.
