= Multivalent battery =

Type of electrochemical battery

Multivalent batteries are energy storage and delivery technologies (i.e., electro-chemical energy storage) that employ multivalent ions, e.g., Mg^{2+}, Ca^{2+}, Zn^{2+}, Al^{3+} as the active charge carrier in the electrolytes as well as in the electrodes (anode and cathode). Multivalent batteries are generally pursued for the potentially greater capacity, owing to greater ion valency, as well as natural mineral abundance.

== Overview ==
Multivalent ion batteries are considered post-Li battery systems that can be potential alternatives to incumbent Li-ion and emerging Lithium metal systems. Owing to their greater valency, they can provide greater energy density and storage capacity. Multivalent minerals are generally available in relatively greater abundance, possibly offering low costs and mitigate concerns over supply chain sustainability. The charge density of multivalent cations is also higher than for monovalent ions.

On the other hand, achieving high ionic conductivity and reversible cycling is more challenging when using multivalent ions as charge carriers.

== Examples ==
=== Magnesium ===
Magnesium (ion) batteries use magnesium ions (Mg^{2+}) as the charge carrier.

=== Calcium ===
Calcium (ion) batteries use calcium ions (Ca^{2+}) as the charge carrier. Current battery configurations include either calcium metal or carbon phases as the anode and oxide or sulfide based ceramics as the cathode.

=== Zinc ===
Zinc (ion) batteries use zinc ions (Zn^{2+}) as the charge carrier. For example Zinc–carbon batteries.

=== Aluminum ===
Aluminum (ion) batteries use aluminum ions (Al^{3+}) as the charge carrier.
