= Potassium tetrafluoroborate =

Names
- IUPAC name Potassium tetrafluoroborate
- Other names: Potassium borofluoride; Potassium fluoroborate; Potassium tetrafluoridoborate; Borate(1-), tetrafluoro-, potassium (1:1)

Identifiers
CAS Number	14075-53-7
3D model (JSmol)	Interactive image
ChEMBL	ChEMBL3188573
ChemSpider	24637
ECHA InfoCard	100.034.466
EC Number	237-928-2
PubChem CID	518872
RTECS number	ED2800000
UNII	7D7045L690
UN number	3260
CompTox Dashboard (EPA)	DTXSID6037015
- InChI: InChI=1S/BF4.K/c2-1(3,4)5;/q-1;+1 Key: AKEBROIVCDHVSD-UHFFFAOYSA-N
- SMILES: [B-](F)(F)(F)F.[K+]

Properties
Chemical formula	KBF_{4}
Molar mass	125.90 g·mol^{−1}
Appearance	colorless orthorhombic crystals
Odor	odorless
Density	2.505 g/cm^{3} (20 °C (68 °F))
Melting point	530 °C (986 °F; 803 K)
Boiling point	decomposes
Solubility in water	0.45 g/100mL (20 °C (68 °F)); 0.55 g/100g (25 °C (77 °F)); 6.3 g/100mL (100 °C (212 °F))
Solubility in ethanol	slightly soluble
Band gap	7.94 eV
Refractive index (n_{D})	1.3245

Structure
Crystal structure	Orthorhombic
Space group	Pnma
Point group	mmm
Lattice constant	a = 5.36 Å, b = 6.94 Å, c = 8.53 Å α = 90°, β = 90°, γ = 90°
Lattice volume (V)	317.63 Å^{3}
Formula units (Z)	4

Thermochemistry
Enthalpy of fusion (Δ_{f}H^{⦵}_{fus})	17.66 kJ⋅mol^{−1}

Hazards
- GHS labelling
Pictograms	(GHS05: Corrosive)
Signal word	Danger
Hazard statements	H314, H315, H319, H335
Precautionary statements	P260, P264, P280, P301+P330+P331, P303+P361+P353, P304+P340, P305+P351+P338, P310, P363, P501
NFPA 704 (fire diamond)	3 0 0
Threshold limit value (TLV)	2.5 mg/m^{3} (TWA)
- Lethal dose or concentration (LD, LC)
LD_{50} (median dose)	5854 mg/kg (rat, oral)
LC_{50} (median concentration)	>5300 mg/m^{3} (rat, inhalation, 4h)
- NIOSH (US health exposure limits)
PEL (Permissible)	2.5 mg/m^{3} (TWA)
REL (Recommended)	2.5 mg/m^{3} (TWA)
IDLH (Immediate danger)	250 mg/m^{3}

Related compounds
Other anions	Potassium tetrahydroborate
Other cations	Lithium tetrafluoroborate; Sodium tetrafluoroborate
- Except where otherwise noted, data are given for materials in their standard state (at 25 °C [77 °F], 100 kPa). Infobox references

Potassium tetrafluoroborate is an inorganic compound with the formula KBF_{4}. It is a colorless, odorless crystalline powder, and crystallizes into orthorhombic space group Pnma.

== Preparation ==
Potassium fluoroborate is obtained by adding a solution of potassium hydroxide (KOH) to a cold solution of boric acid (H_{3}BO_{3}) in 40% hydrofluoric acid (HF) in a platinum dish:

H_{3}BO_{3} + 4 HF + KOH → KBF_{4} + 4 H_{2}O

== Reactions ==
Potassium tetrafluoroborate has been reacted with molten lithium chloride (LiCl), sodium chloride (NaCl), and potassium chloride (KCl). Lithium ions cause the decomposition of tetrafluoroborate leading to the production of BCl_{3} gas. The other liquid alkali chlorides do not decompose the tetrafluoroborate, even though they are at higher temperatures.

It may be used to produce boron trifluoride (BF_{3}) by heating the molten salt with boron trioxide (B_{2}O_{3}) at 600 °C (1,112 °F) in an iron tube connected to a drying tube filled with dry potassium fluoride (KF) followed by a liquid nitrogen cooled trap:

KBF_{4} + 2 B_{2}O_{3} → BF_{3} + KF·B_{4}O_{6}

The collected impure BF_{3} is purified via fractional distillation.

== Uses ==
Potassium tetrafluoroborate is used in p-type semiconductor doping to introduce boron into the silicon lattice in an easily controlled way. It is also used in etching solutions for silicon wafers and as a soldering flux in high temperature soldering.
