= Lithium hexafluorophosphate =

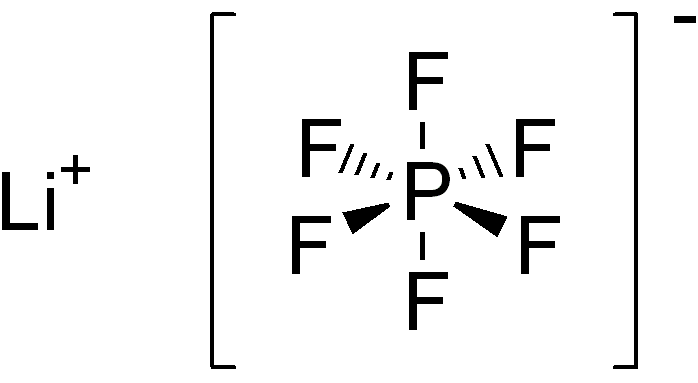

Names
- IUPAC name lithium hexafluorophosphate

Identifiers
CAS Number	21324-40-3
3D model (JSmol)	Interactive image
ChEBI	CHEBI:172376
ChemSpider	146939
ECHA InfoCard	100.040.289
PubChem CID	23688915
UNII	T9T8DY51J3
CompTox Dashboard (EPA)	DTXSID2066698
- InChI: InChI=1S/F6P.Li/c1-7(2,3,4,5)6;/q-1;+1 Key: AXPLOJNSKRXQPA-UHFFFAOYSA-N; InChI=1/F6P.Li/c1-7(2,3,4,5)6;/q-1;+1 Key: AXPLOJNSKRXQPA-UHFFFAOYAJ
- SMILES: [Li+].F[P-](F)(F)(F)(F)F

Properties
Chemical formula	LiPF_{6}
Molar mass	151.905 g/mol
Appearance	white powder
Density	2.84 g/cm^{3}
Melting point	200 °C (392 °F; 473 K)
Solubility in water	soluble

Hazards
- GHS labelling
Pictograms	(GHS05: Corrosive)
Signal word	Danger
Hazard statements	H314
Precautionary statements	P280, P305+P351+P338, P310
Flash point	Non-flammable
Safety data sheet (SDS)	External MSDS

Related compounds
Other anions	Lithium tetrafluoroborate
Other cations	Sodium hexafluorophosphate Potassium hexafluorophosphate Ammonium hexafluorophosphate
- Except where otherwise noted, data are given for materials in their standard state (at 25 °C [77 °F], 100 kPa). verify (what is ?) Infobox references

Lithium hexafluorophosphate is an inorganic compound with the formula LiPF_{6}. It is a white crystalline powder.

== Production ==
LiPF_{6} is manufactured by reacting phosphorus pentachloride with hydrogen fluoride and lithium fluoride

PCl_{5} + LiF + 5 HF → LiPF_{6} + 5 HCl

== Chemistry ==
The salt is relatively stable thermally, but loses 50% weight at 200 °C (392 °F). It hydrolyzes near 70 °C (158 °F) according to the following equation forming highly toxic HF gas:

LiPF_{6} + 4 H_{2}O → LiF + 5 HF + H_{3}PO_{4}

Owing to the Lewis acidity of the Li^{+} ions, LiPF_{6} also catalyses the tetrahydropyranylation of tertiary alcohols.

In lithium-ion batteries, LiPF_{6} reacts with Li_{2}CO_{3}, which may be catalysed by small amounts of HF:

LiPF_{6} + Li_{2}CO_{3} → POF_{3} + CO_{2} + 3 LiF

== Application ==
The main use of LiPF_{6} is in commercial secondary batteries, an application that exploits its high solubility in polar aprotic solvents. Specifically, solutions of lithium hexafluorophosphate in carbonate blends of ethylene carbonate, dimethyl carbonate, diethyl carbonate and/or ethyl methyl carbonate, with a small amount of one or many additives such as fluoroethylene carbonate and vinylene carbonate, serve as state-of-the-art electrolytes in lithium-ion batteries. This application takes advantage of the inertness of the hexafluorophosphate anion toward strong reducing agents, such as lithium metal, as well as of the ability of [PF6-] to passivate the positive aluminium current collector.
