= Calcium battery =

Battery with a calcium electrode

Calcium (ion) batteries are energy storage and delivery technologies (i.e., electro–chemical energy storage) that employ calcium ions (cations), Ca^{2+}, as the active charge carrier. Calcium (ion) batteries remain an active area of research, with studies and work persisting in the discovery and development of electrodes and electrolytes that enable stable, long-term battery operation. Calcium batteries are rapidly emerging as a recognized alternative to Li-ion technology due to their similar performance, significantly greater abundance, and lower cost.

== History ==
Calcium batteries date to the 1960s, used as thermal batteries for military and space applications. The first example of an electrochemical cell was $\ce{Ca//SOCl2}$ as a primary cell. Early examination of Ca^{2+} intercalation hosts proposed transition metal oxides and sulfides. The study of calcium batteries as well as calcium electro-chemistry continued. Research expanded owing to developments in effective Ca-metal redox activity, particularly at room temperature, which had been a longstanding challenge.

== Comparison ==
=== Material properties ===
Calcium metal offers high conductivity and high melting temperature (842 °C) relative to other metals. The higher melting temperature can make calcium metal inherently safer in batteries. Calcium is environmentally harmless, mitigating concerns over toxicity.

=== Resource and supply ===
Calcium batteries are one of many candidates to replace lithium-ion battery technology. It is a multivalent battery. Key advantages are lower cost, earth abundance (41,500 ppm), higher energy density, high capacity and high cell voltage, and potentially higher power density. Calcium is the fifth-most abundant mineral in the Earth's crust, the most abundant alkaline earth metal, and the third-most abundant metal after aluminum (Al) and iron (Fe). The United States is the largest producer (by annual production) of calcium (primarily limestone). Other major producers include Russia and China.

=== Electrochemistry ===
Calcium batteries possibly have higher cell voltages than magnesium batteries due to the 0.5 V lower standard reduction potential of the former. Ca^{2+} ions have the potential for faster reaction kinetics versus magnesium (Mg^{2+}) owing to its less polarizing properties and charge density both in the electrolyte as well as in an intercalation cathode.

=== Capacity and energy density ===
Calcium metal anodes have a 2^{+} oxidation state which could provide greater energy density over monovalent systems (i.e., Li^{+} and Na^{+).} Calcium has a standard reduction potential of 2.9 V, only 0.17 V greater than that of lithium metal. A calcium metal anode offers higher volumetric capacity and gravimetric capacities (2072 mAh/mL and 1337 mAh/g, respectively) than commercial graphite anodes in Li-ion batteries (300–430 mAh/mL and 372 mAh/g). A calcium sulfur (CaS) battery has theoretical energy densities of 3202 Wh/L and 1835 Wh/kg, versus 2800 Wh/L for Li/S.

=== Comparison to other battery systems ===
Calcium batteries offer promising performance, safety, and sustainability compared to other prevalent battery technologies, such as lithium, sodium, magnesium, aluminum, potassium, and zinc. Specific advantages of calcium include higher energy density, enhanced safety, greater abundance, and stability, reinforcing its potential as the leading choice for future battery applications.

Comparison of calcium batteries to other systems.
Battery Type	Why Calcium (Ca) is Better
Lithium (Li)	Abundance & Safety: Calcium is more abundant and safer than lithium, which is rare and highly flammable, presenting risks of fire in applications like electric vehicles.
Sodium (Na)	Energy Density: Calcium offers a double charge (Ca^2+) compared to the single charge (Na^+), resulting in higher energy densities for the same volume.
Magnesium (Mg)	Practicality: While magnesium also offers a double charge, its practical use in batteries is hindered by the high cost of suitable electrolytes and issues with corrosion and degradation.
Aluminum (Al)	Rechargeability & Stability: Aluminum struggles with rechargeability and electrode stability. Calcium offers better stability and potential for rechargeable solutions without significant performance degradation.
Potassium (K)	Abundance & Charge Efficiency: Potassium, though having similar abundance issues as calcium, lacks the double charge advantage of calcium, limiting its efficiency and application in higher energy density scenarios.
Zinc (Zn)	Voltage & Capacity: Zinc typically has lower voltages and capacities in battery applications compared to calcium. Calcium's superior charge properties and stability make it more suitable for high-performance batteries.

== Components ==
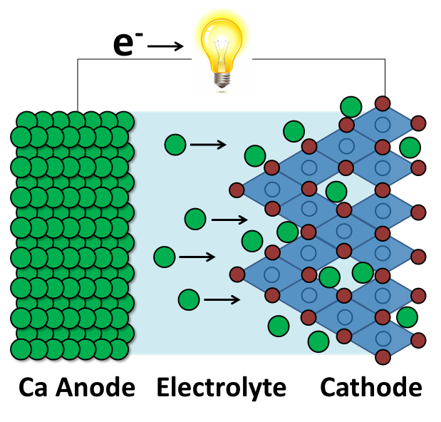
Schematic of a calcium metal battery consisting of a calcium metal anode, an electrolyte - most often liquid, and an intercalation, organic or sulfur cathode.

A calcium battery has yet to be commercialized. Efforts concentrate on developing effective anode and cathode materials, as well as stable electrolytes. Intensive focus has been placed on achieving reliable electrochemistry with a pure calcium metal anode seeking high operating voltages, capacities, and energy densities. However, carbon and metal oxide-based anodes, while featuring lower performance metrics, are also reliable. Cathode research has sought high Ca^{2+} migration kinetics, high capacity, as well as high operative voltages.

=== Electrolytes ===
==== Calcium salt component ====
Salts explored in liquid electrolytes include: calcium tetrafluoroborate (Ca(BF_{4})_{2}, calcium borohydride (Ca(BH_{4})_{2}, calcium bis(trifluoromethanesulfonimide) (Ca(TFSI)_{2}), calcium perchlorate (Ca(ClO_{4})_{2}), calcium hexafluorophosphate (Ca(PF_{6})_{2}), and calcium nitrate (Ca(NO_{3})_{2}). Calcium nitrate is commonly used in aqueous batteries. Early studies revealed that reversible Ca deposition using simple Ca salts is impossible at room temperature. A Ca salt using a bulky, low-coordinating tetra-hexafluoroisopropoxy borate anion [Ca(B(Ohfip)_{4})_{2}] was independently examined by three research groups. It was shown to be active for Ca deposition at room temperature with Coulumbic efficiency up to 80% and anodic stability up to 4.1 V vs Ca. The [Ca(B(Ohfip)_{4})_{2}] electrolyte remains the most active electrolyte, but is far below the standard for practical applications.

==== Liquid ====
Several electrolyte systems have been examined. Many candidates show low electrochemical stability. Redox reactions on calcium metal in several organic electrolytes avoid Ca deposition by using (Ca(ClO_{4})_{2}) and Ca(BF_{4})_{2} in organic solvents. Water and alkyl carbonate, ionic liquids, mixed cation electrolytes with Li/Ca and Na/Ca (BH_{4}^{−} and PF_{6}^{−} anion), and K/Ca (PF_{6}^{−} anion) have been examined. Salt solvation studies of different solvents were conducted. Theoretical studies on both salts and aprotic solvents show favorable solvation/de-solvation properties.

==== Polymer ====
Polymer electrolytes have been examined as a way to combine the functions of battery separator and electrolyte. One of the first samples of a polymer electrolyte was PVA/PVP complexed with CaCl_{2}. Subsequent studies demonstrated polymer electrolytes made from poly(ethylene glycol) diacrylate (PEDGA) and polytetrahydrofuran (PTHF) both with calcium nitrate (Ca(NO_{3})_{2}), polyethylene oxide, single-ion conducting polymers based on PEG and PTHF backbones and TFSI anions, PEDGA-based gel polymer electrolytes, polyvinyl imidazole, PVDF gel electrolytes, using solvents such as alkyl carbonates and ionic liquids. Most recently, a poly(vinyl imidazole) electrolyte demonstrated one of the highest conductivities for Ca^{2+} to date.

==== Solid ====
Solid electrolytes (i.e., ceramics) have been proposed, but studies remain theoretical.

=== Reference Electrodes ===
Suitable reference electrodes are crucial for accurate and comparable electrochemical studies and performance metrics of various anode and cathode systems. Using calcium metal as a reference electrode presents challenges due to its instability, passivation concerns, and voltage drift. Alternatives include Cl/Cl^{+}, activated carbon, and Ag_{2}S electrodes.

One study introduced a silver(I) sulfide (Ag_{2}S) reference electrode for calcium-ion battery research, based on a silver wire coated with silver(I) sulfide crystals. The standard reduction potential of Ag_{2}S relative to the standard hydrogen electrode was determined to vary from −0.291 to −0.477 V, with a linear voltage drift behavior having slopes between −0.28 and −2.45 mV/h.

=== Anodes ===
Calcium anodes have focused on using metal anodes, metal oxides, carbons, and metals/semiconductors as alloying compounds.

Examples include vanadium oxide (V_{2}O_{5}), copper-calcium alloying, MgV_{2}O_{5}, graphite, metallic calcium, and silicon anodes. Recent work on plating/stripping calcium was done in ethylene carbonate/propylene carbonate (EC/PC) solutions at elevated temperatures. Calcium metal anodes showed practical plating at room temperature in electrolytes such as tetrahydrofuran (THF) and a binary mixture of ethylene carbonate and propylene carbonate (EC/PC). Aqueous batteries have used calcium vanadate. Graphene-like materials, such as hexa-peri-hexabenzocoronene nanographene, have been considered.

=== Cathodes ===
Work on calcium cathodes focused on the experimental and theoretical investigation of intercalation compounds as well as sulfur as a conversion cathode.

Significant progress has been made with employing generally good intercalation materials, as well as ceramics with crystal structures that provide low migration energy barriers for Ca^{2+} to move through the lattice. Calcium's divalency and large ionic radius necessitates intercalation hosts with relatively open crystal frameworks and milder crystal polarization for better diffusion kinetics. Layered materials, whereby Ca^{2+} is transported through the van der Waals gap, is another approach to enable faster diffusion.

Calcium metal oxides and sulfides are areas of study. Candidates include calcium manganese oxide, calcium cobalt oxide and titanium disulfide, hexacyanoferrates, or dual carrier batteries, and aqueous batteries. Theoretical work examined the potential of cathodes from different crystal structures such as perovskite (CaMO_{3}), spinel (CaM_{2}O_{4}, post-spinel spinel (CaM_{2}O_{4}), other naturally occurring calcium compounds, metal selenides such as TiSe_{2}, and other calcium lanthanide oxide phases.

Migration energy barriers have also been discussed.

=== Calcium–sulfur ===
A primary Ca–S battery was examined. Ca-S batteries using Li as a mediator to make it reversible were studied. The discovery of reliable electrolytes for plating/stripping calcium metal have aided in stable Ca//S battery cycling, however, poly-sulfide dissolution remains an issue.

=== Calcium–air ===
A calcium–air (Ca–O_{2}) battery was examined. Unlike Li-O_{2} batteries, in which lithium can form a superoxide that undergoes easy redox activity, calcium oxidizes only to the chemical stable calcium oxide (CaO), hence suitable catalytic systems are required for reduction of CaO during battery charging. Reliable plating and stripping at the Ca anode is also critical.

In 2024, a team developed a calcium–oxygen (Ca–O_{2}) battery that is rechargeable for 700 cycles at room temperature. This battery utilized a highly reversible two-electron redox reaction, forming calcium peroxide (CaO_{2}) as the discharge product. A durable ionic liquid-based electrolyte facilitated Ca plating–stripping at the Ca metal anode and improved CaO_{2}/O_{2} redox at the air cathode. The Ca–O_{2} battery was stable in air and can be made into flexible fibers. These fibers could be woven into textile batteries for next-generation wearable systems.

=== Calcium-Chlorine ===
One study introduced a rechargeable Ca/Cl_{2} battery utilizing a reversible cathode redox reaction between CaCl_{2} and Cl_{2}, facilitated by lithium difluoro(oxalate)borate as an electrolyte mediator. The Ca/Cl_{2} battery achieved discharge voltages of 3V, a specific capacity of 1000 mAh.g^{−1}, and a rate capability of 500 mA.g^{−1}. It also demonstrates excellent capacity retention (96.5% after 30 days) and low-temperature capability (down to 0 °C).

== Performance ==
Several calcium metal batteries with different cathodes have thus far been examined:

- Ca//V_{2}O_{5},
- Ca//Ca_{4}Fe_{9}O_{17},
- Ca//LiTiO_{2},
- Ca/Carbon-Fiber,
- Ca//TiS_{2},
- Ca//FePO_{4},
- Ca//Ca_{3}Co_{2}O_{6},
- Ca//PAQ,
- Ca//S.

C-rates range from 0.2 to >5 C. Capacities range from 50 to 250 mAh/g, with operating voltages between 1 and 4 V. Current densities are in the range of 20–500 mA/g, and energy densities of ~250 Wh/kg.

== Applications ==
Owing in the potentially greater weight, calcium batteries have been proposed for use in stationary applications, such as grid storage.

== Research ==
Several groups are dedicated to commercial-grade rechargeable calcium batteries. The include:

- CARBAT (Europe)
- Syracuse Center of Excellence (USA)
- Joint Center for Energy Storage Research (USA).

== Challenges ==
Calcium batteries show capacity fading and lower energy densities than Li-metal batteries. The solid electrolyte interface (SEI) shows slow migration of Ca^{2+} ions. Ca metal undergoes dendritic growth at high current rates. The form of the calcium deposits are critical for long-term battery operation. Calcium batteries that provide comparable energy densities of incumbent Li-ion and Li-metal batteries require a pure Ca metal anode. Calcium is significantly harder metal than lithium, complicating manufacture of calcium foils.

Calcium salts generally show strong coordination between the Ca^{2+} and the anion, consequently requiring strongly coordinating solvents, such as carbonates, in order to produce electrolytes with sufficient salt solubility. This results in slow kinetics. More weakly coordinating salts allow for weakly coordinating solvents to be employed, which shows significantly increased kinetics.

Intercalation hosts require open frameworks and simple migration pathways for ion transport.
