= Sodium tetrafluoroborate =

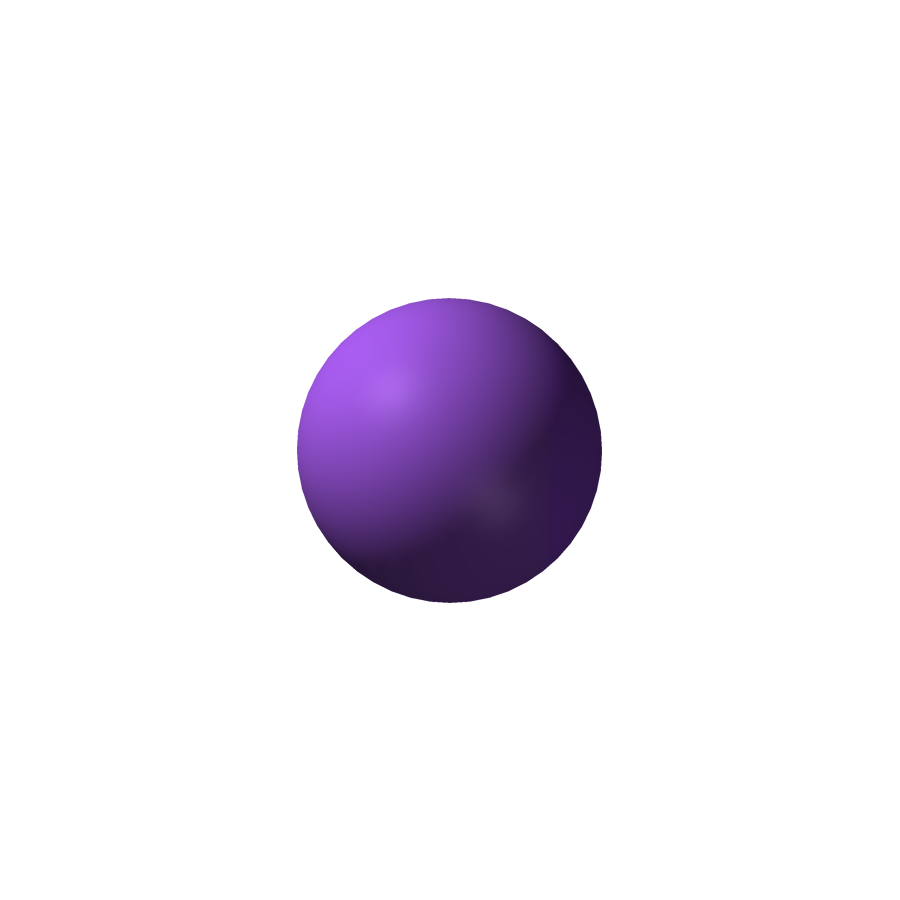
The sodium cation
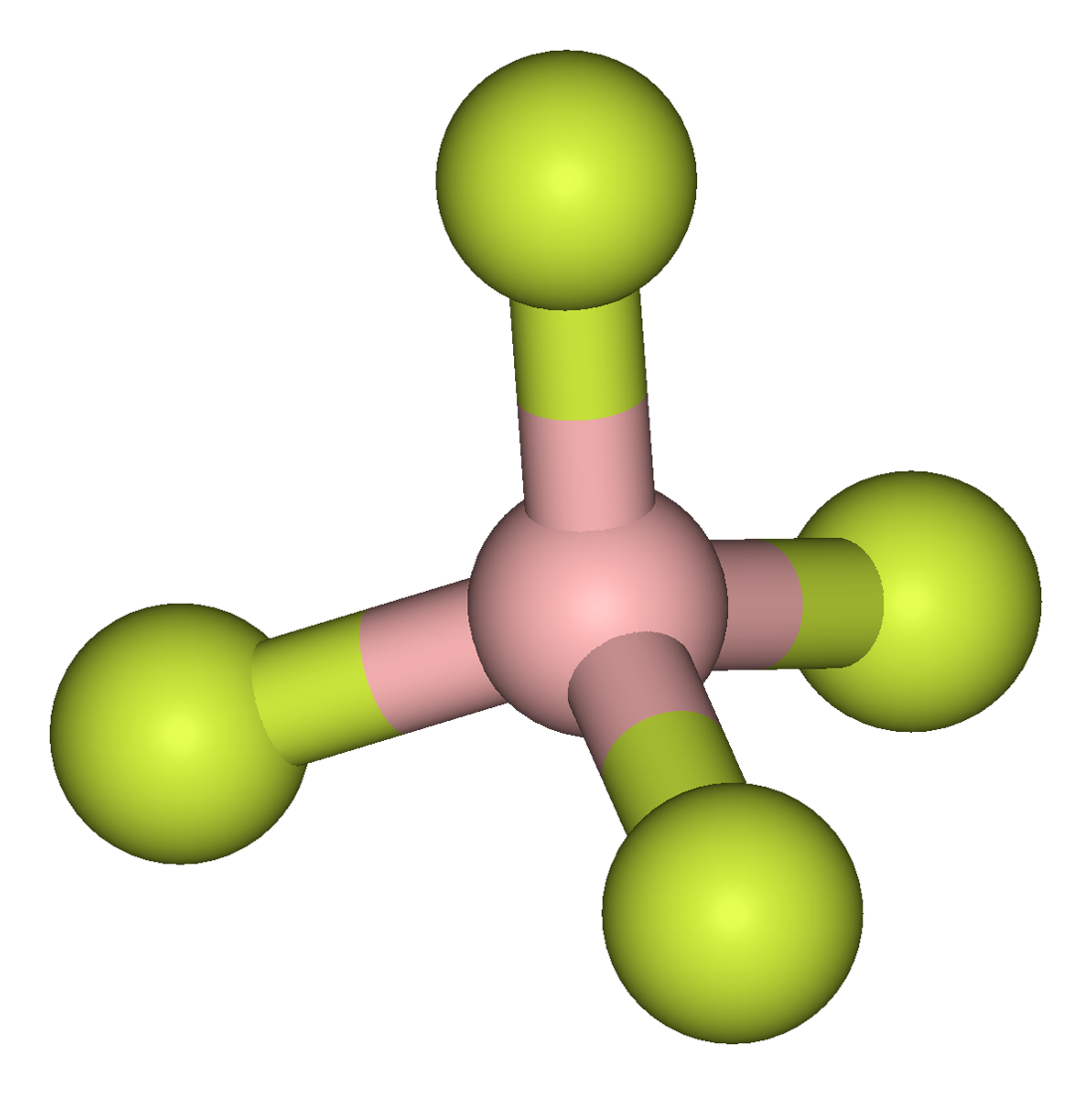
The tetrafluoroborate anion (ball-and-stick model)

Names
- Other names: Sodium fluoroborate; Borate(1-), tetrafluoro-, sodium

Identifiers
CAS Number	13755-29-8
3D model (JSmol)	Interactive image
ChemSpider	24462
ECHA InfoCard	100.033.931
EC Number	237-340-6
PubChem CID	4343483
UNII	CFC805A5WR
UN number	3260
CompTox Dashboard (EPA)	DTXSID9021477
- InChI: InChI=1S/BF4.Na/c2-1(3,4)5;/q-1;+1
- SMILES: [B-](F)(F)(F)F.[Na+]

Properties
Chemical formula	NaBF_{4}
Molar mass	109.79 g·mol^{−1}
Appearance	white orthorhombic prisms
Density	2.47 g/cm^{3}
Melting point	384 °C (723 °F; 657 K)
Solubility in water	108 g/100g (20 °C (68 °F))
Solubility in ethanol	slightly soluble
Band gap	7.85 eV

Structure
Crystal structure	Orthorhombic
Space group	Cmcm
Point group	mmm
Lattice constant	a = 6.05 Å, b = 6.73 Å, c = 6.72 Å α = 90°, β = 90°, γ = 90°
Lattice volume (V)	273.69 Å^{3}
Formula units (Z)	4

Hazards
- GHS labelling
Pictograms	(GHS05: Corrosive)
Signal word	Danger
Hazard statements	H314
Precautionary statements	P260, P264, P280, P301+P330+P331, P303+P361+P353, P304+P340+P310, P305+P351+P338+P310, P363, P405, P501
NFPA 704 (fire diamond)	3 0 0
Threshold limit value (TLV)	2.5 mg/m^{3} (TWA)
- NIOSH (US health exposure limits)
PEL (Permissible)	2.5 mg/m^{3} (TWA)
REL (Recommended)	5 mg/m^{3} (TWA)
IDLH (Immediate danger)	250 mg/m^{3}

Related compounds
Other cations	Nitrosonium tetrafluoroborate; Potassium tetrafluoroborate
- Except where otherwise noted, data are given for materials in their standard state (at 25 °C [77 °F], 100 kPa). verify (what is ?) Infobox references

Sodium tetrafluoroborate is an inorganic compound with formula NaBF_{4}. It is a salt that forms colorless or white orthorhombic crystals.

Sodium tetrafluoroborate is used in some fluxes used for brazing and to produce boron trifluoride.

== Preparation ==
Sodium tetrafluoroborate can be prepared by neutralizing tetrafluoroboric acid with sodium carbonate or sodium hydroxide.

NaOH + HBF_{4} → NaBF_{4} + H_{2}O
Na_{2}CO_{3} + 2 HBF_{4} → 2 NaBF_{4} + H_{2}O + CO_{2}

Alternatively the chemical can be synthesized from boric acid, hydrofluoric acid, and sodium carbonate:

2 H_{3}BO_{3} + 8 HF + Na_{2}CO_{3} → 2 NaBF_{4} + 7 H_{2}O + CO_{2}

== Reactions and uses ==
On heating to its melting point, sodium tetrafluoroborate decomposes to sodium fluoride (NaF) and boron trifluoride (BF_{3}):

NaBF_{4} → NaF + BF_{3}

It is a source of tetrafluoroborate anion, which is used in organic chemistry for the preparation of salts. Sodium tetrafluoroborate can be used for synthesis of ionic liquids, where tetrafluoroborate is the anion.
