= Ammonium hexafluorophosphate =

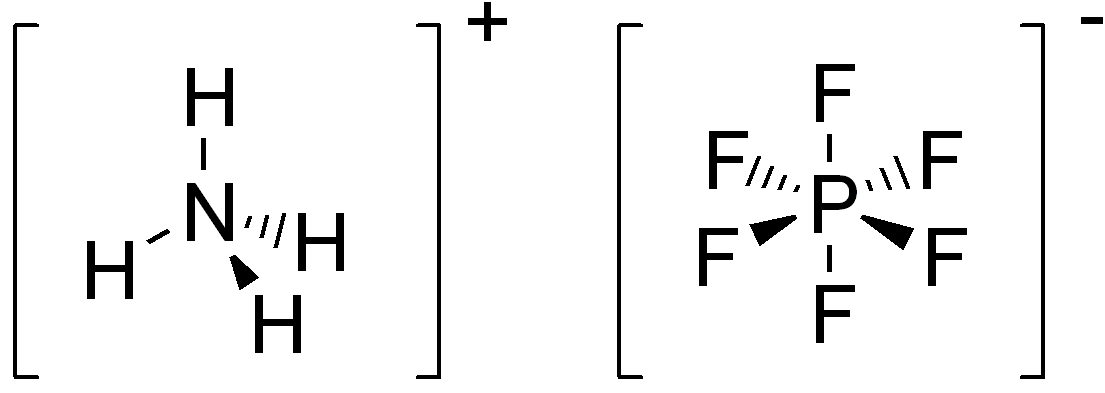

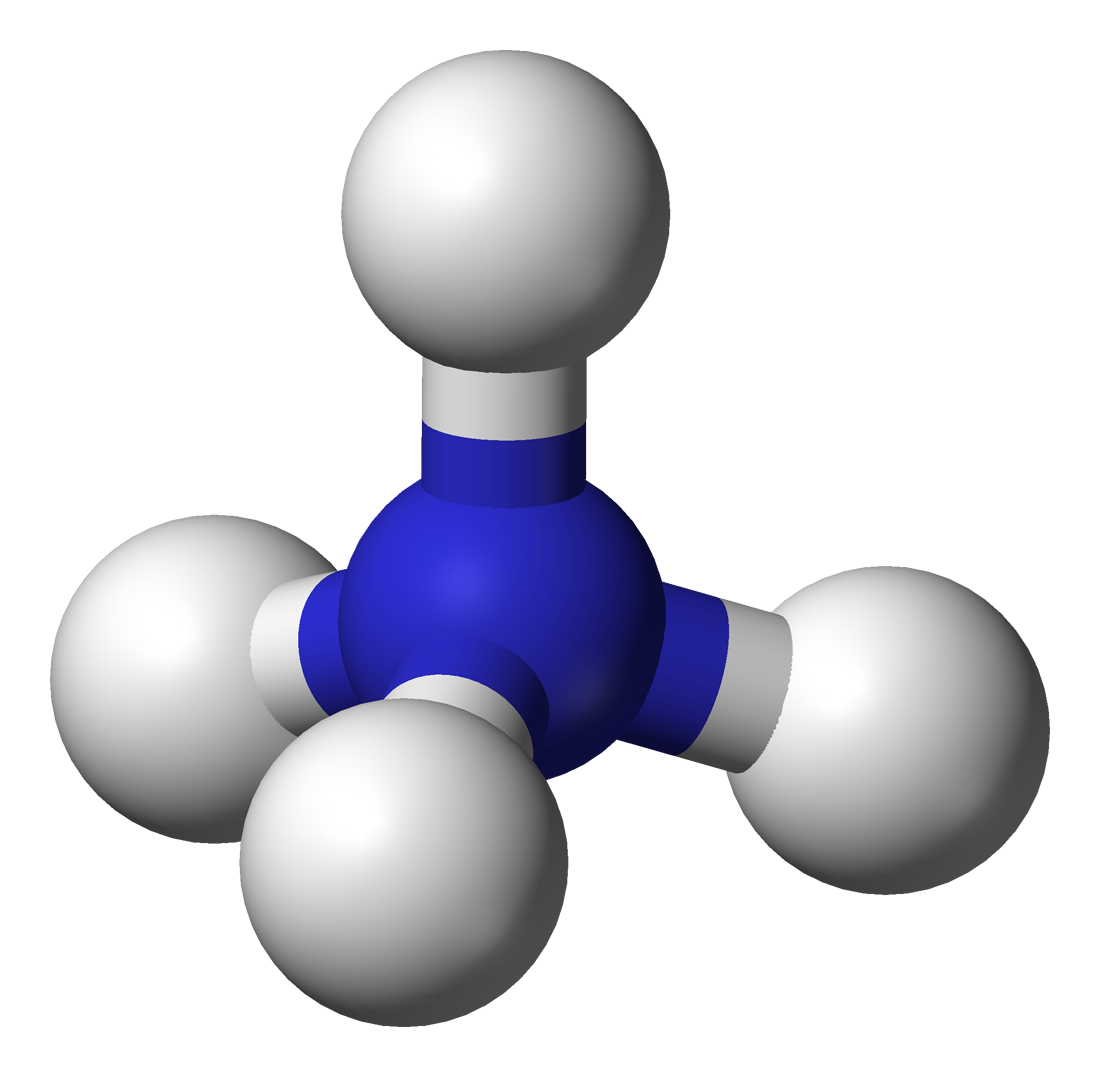
Ball-and-stick model of the ammonium cation
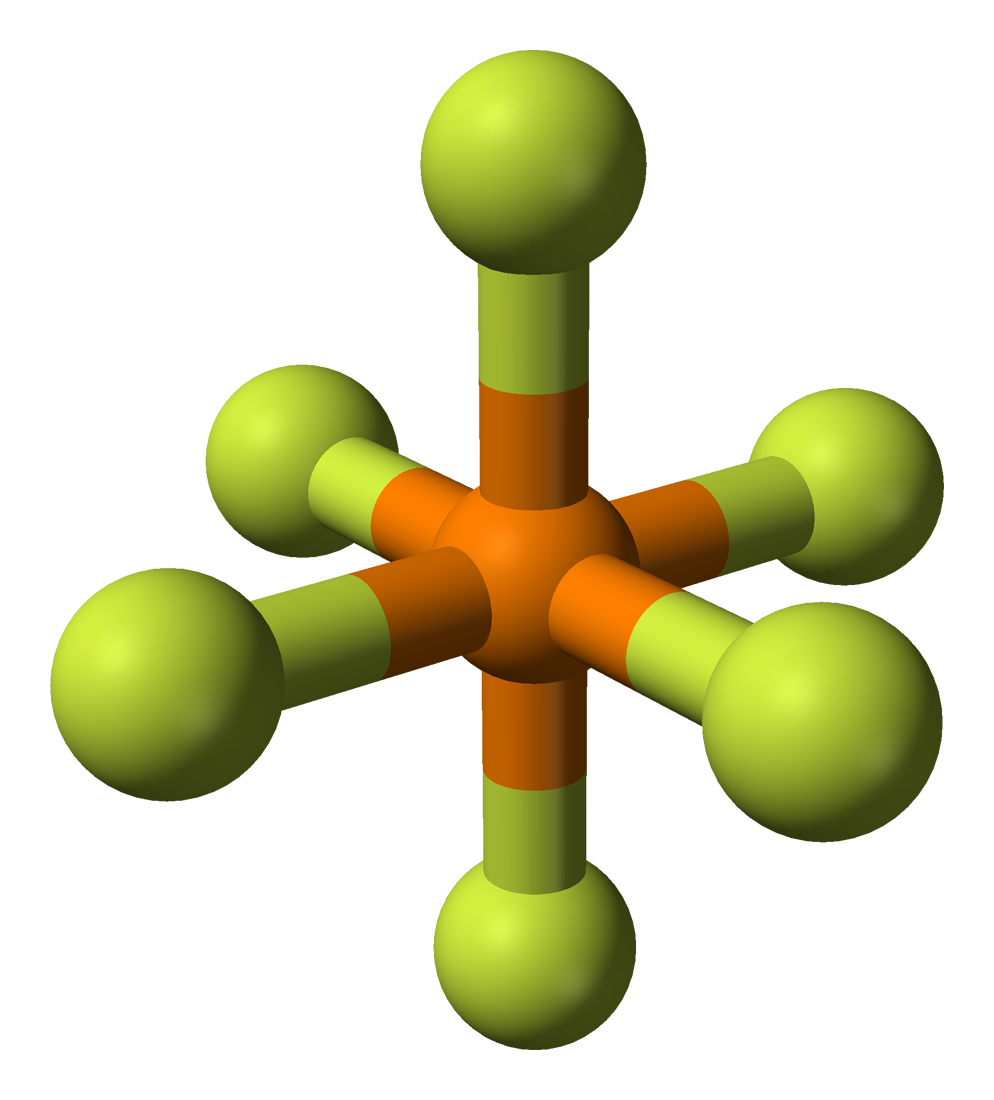
Ball-and-stick model of the hexafluorophosphate anion

Names
- IUPAC name ammonium hexafluorophosphate

Identifiers
CAS Number	16941-11-0
3D model (JSmol)	Interactive image; Interactive image
ChemSpider	7969679
ECHA InfoCard	100.037.266
EC Number	241-009-1
PubChem CID	9793912
UNII	NS308031PJ
CompTox Dashboard (EPA)	DTXSID00884948
- InChI: InChI=1S/F6P.H3N/c1-7(2,3,4,5)6;/h;1H3/q-1;/p+1 Key: NIZXKAYXSNUDOU-UHFFFAOYSA-O; InChI=1/F6P.H3N/c1-7(2,3,4,5)6;/h;1H3/q-1;/p+1 Key: NIZXKAYXSNUDOU-IKLDFBCSAF
- SMILES: [NH4+].F[P-](F)(F)(F)(F)F; F[P-](F)(F)(F)(F)F.[NH4+]

Properties
Chemical formula	(NH_{4})[PF_{6}]
Molar mass	163.00264
Appearance	white solid
Density	2.180 g/cm^{3}
Solubility in water	74.8 g/100 mL(20 °C)

Hazards
- GHS labelling
Pictograms	(GHS05: Corrosive)
Signal word	Danger
Hazard statements	H314
Precautionary statements	P260, P264, P280, P301+P330+P331, P303+P361+P353, P304+P340, P305+P351+P338, P310, P321, P363, P405, P501
Safety data sheet (SDS)	Oxford MSDS
- Except where otherwise noted, data are given for materials in their standard state (at 25 °C [77 °F], 100 kPa). verify (what is ?) Infobox references

Ammonium hexafluorophosphate is the inorganic compound with the formula NH_{4}PF_{6}. It is a white water-soluble, hygroscopic solid. The compound is a salt consisting of the ammonium cation and hexafluorophosphate anion. It is commonly used as a source of the hexafluorophosphate anion, a weakly coordinating anion. It is prepared by combining neat ammonium fluoride and phosphorus pentachloride. Alternatively it can also be produced from phosphonitrilic chloride:

PCl_{5} + 6 NH_{4}F → NH_{4}PF_{6} + 5 NH_{4}Cl

PNCl_{2} + 6 HF → NH_{4}PF_{6} + 2 HCl
