= Lithium–air battery =

Metal–air electrochemical cell

- Specific energy: 40.104 MJ/kg (11,140 Wh/kg) theoretical
- Energy density: ? J/m³
- Nominal cell voltage: 2.91 V

The lithium–air battery (Li–air) is a metal–air electrochemical cell or battery chemistry that uses oxidation of lithium at the anode and reduction of oxygen at the cathode to induce a current flow.

Pairing lithium and ambient oxygen can theoretically lead to electrochemical cells with the highest possible specific energy. Indeed, the theoretical specific energy of a non-aqueous Li–air battery, in the charged state with Li_{2}O_{2} product and excluding the oxygen mass, is ~40.1 MJ/kg. This is comparable to the theoretical specific energy of gasoline, ~46.8 MJ/kg. In practice, Li–air batteries with a specific energy of ~6.12 MJ/kg lithium at the cell level have been demonstrated. This is about 5 times greater than that of a commercial lithium-ion battery, and is sufficient to run a 2,000 kg electric vehicle for ~500 km (310 miles) on a single charge using 60 kg of lithium (i.e. 20.4 kWh/100 km). However, the practical power and cycle life of Li–air batteries need significant improvements before they can find a market niche.

Significant electrolyte advances are needed to develop a commercial implementation. Four approaches are being considered: aprotic, aqueous, solid-state and mixed aqueous–aprotic.

A major market driver for batteries is the automotive sector. The energy density of gasoline is approximately 13 kW·h/kg, which corresponds to 1.7 kW·h/kg of energy provided to the wheels after losses. Theoretically, lithium–air can achieve 12 kW·h/kg (43.2 MJ/kg) excluding the oxygen mass. Accounting for the weight of the full battery pack (casing, air channels, lithium substrate), reduces the effective energy density.

== History ==
Originally proposed in the 1970s as a possible power source for battery electric vehicles, and hybrid electric vehicles, Li–air batteries recaptured scientific interest late in the first decade of the 2000s due to advances in materials science.

Although the idea of a lithium–air battery was around long before 1996, the risk-to-benefit ratio was perceived as too high to pursue. Indeed, both the negative (lithium metal) and the positive (air or oxygen) electrodes are the reasons why, respectively, rechargeable lithium-metal batteries failed to reach the market in the 1970s (the lithium-ion battery in a cellphone uses a LiC_{6}-graphite compound on the negative electrode, not a lithium metal). Nevertheless, due to a perceived lack of other alternatives to high specific energy rechargeable batteries, and due to some initially promising results from academic labs, both the number of patents and of free-domain publications related to lithium–oxygen (including Li–air) batteries began growing exponentially in 2006. However, the technical difficulties facing such batteries, especially recharging times, nitrogen and water sensitivity, and the intrinsic poor conductivity of the charged Li_{2}O_{2} species are major challenges.

In 2025, a research group from the Illinois Institute of Technology and Argonne National Laboratory announced a prototype that exploited a four-electron chemical reaction path that forms and decomposes lithium oxide, which expands available energy storage. Earlier attempts typically produced lithium peroxide or lithium superoxide, with lower energy density. They used a solid-state ceramic-polyethylene oxide polymer and lithium-rich nanoparticle matrix electrolyte that stopped leaks and stabilized operation.

In 2026, the world's largest battery maker CATL announced that it intended to make lithium-air batteries the focus of its future development and that it had achieved energy density of 1,200 Wh/kg in a prototype device.

== Design and operation ==
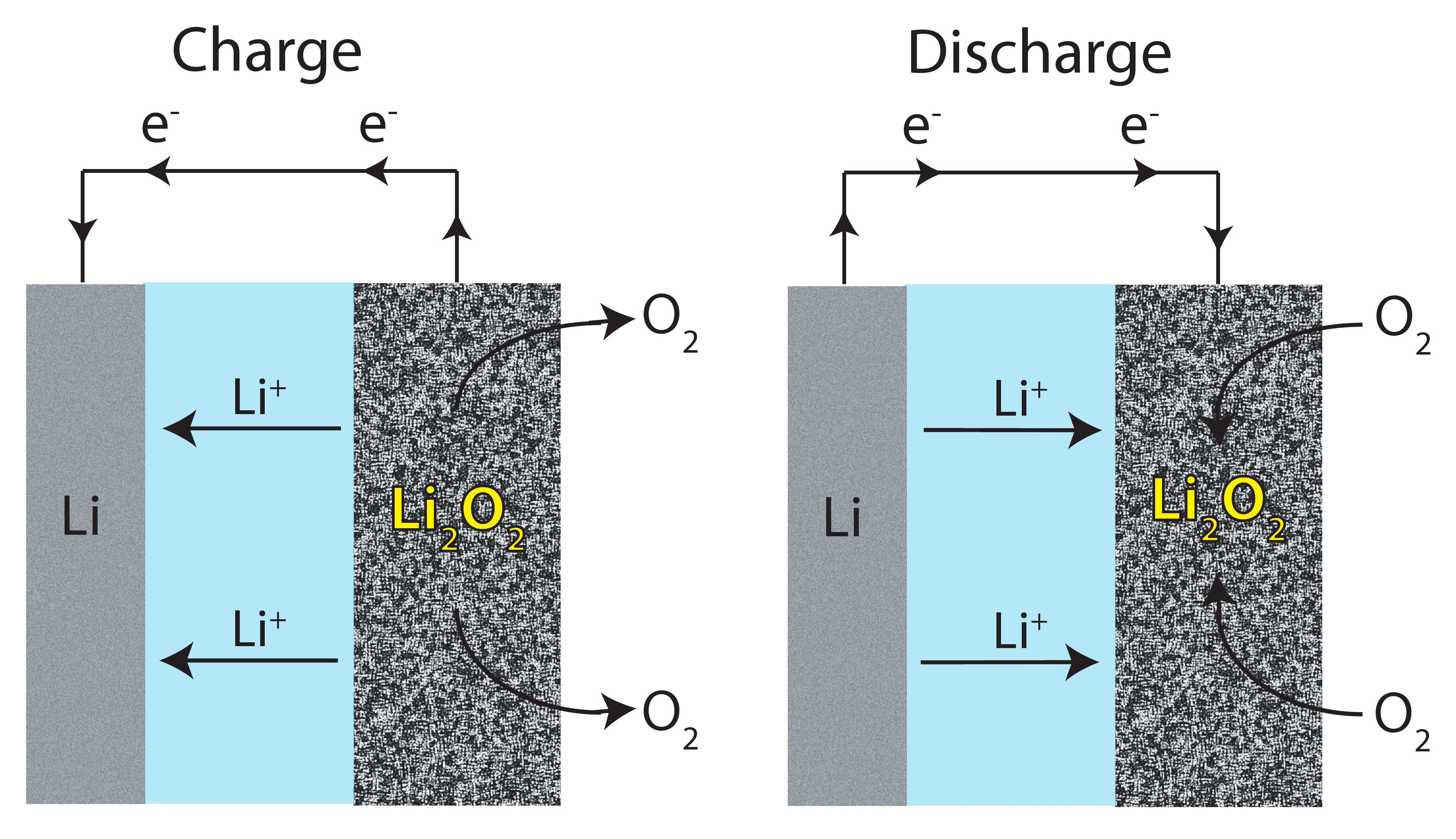
Schematic of lithium–air battery charge and discharge cycles

In general, lithium ions move between the anode and the cathode across the electrolyte. Under discharge, electrons follow the external circuit to do electric work and the lithium ions migrate to the cathode. During charge the lithium metal plates onto the anode, freeing O_{2} at the cathode. Both non-aqueous (with Li_{2}O_{2} or LiO_{2} as the discharge products) and aqueous (LiOH as the discharge product) Li-O_{2} batteries have been considered. The aqueous battery requires a protective layer on the negative electrode to keep the Li metal from reacting with water.

=== Anode ===
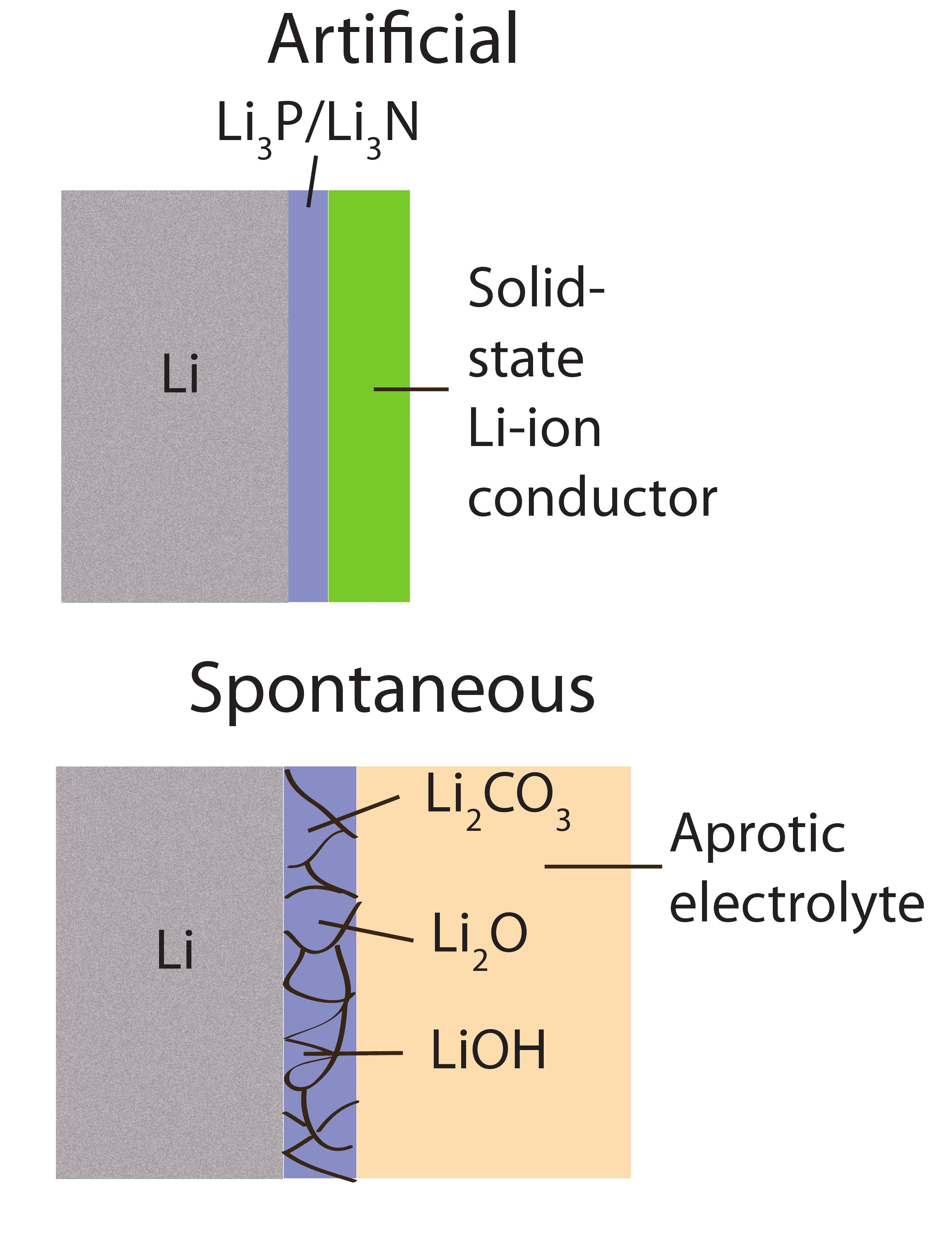
Schematic of artificial vs. spontaneous electrolyte interface

Lithium metal is the typical anode choice. At the anode, electrochemical potential forces the lithium metal to release electrons via oxidation (without involving the cathodic oxygen). The half-reaction is:

Li ⇌ Li^{+} + e^{−}

Lithium has high specific capacity (3,840 mAh/g) compared with other metal–air battery materials (820 mAh/g for zinc, 2,965 mAh/g for aluminium). Several issues affect such cells. The main challenge in anode development is preventing the anode from reacting with the electrolyte. Alternatives include new electrolyte materials or redesigning the interface between electrolyte and anode. Lithium anodes risk dendritic lithium deposits, decreasing energy capacity or triggering a short circuit. The effects of pore size and pore size distribution remain poorly understood.

Upon charging/discharging in aprotic cells, layers of lithium salts precipitate onto the anode, eventually covering it and creating a barrier between the lithium and electrolyte. This barrier initially prevents corrosion, but eventually inhibits the reaction kinetics between the anode and the electrolyte. This chemical change of the solid–electrolyte interface (SEI) results in varying chemical composition across the surface, causing the current to vary accordingly. The uneven current distribution furthers branching dendrite growth and typically leads to a short circuit between the anode and cathode.

In aqueous cells problems at the SEI stem from the high reactivity of lithium metal with water.

Several approaches attempt to overcome these problems:

- Formation of a Li-ion protective layer using di- and triblock copolymer electrolytes. According to Seeo, Inc., such electrolytes (e.g., polystyrene with the high Li-ion conductivity of a soft polymer segment, such as a poly(ethylene oxide (PEO) and Li-salt mixture) ) combine the mechanical stability of a hard polymer segment with the high ionic conductivity of the soft polymer–lithium-salt mixture. The hardness inhibits dendrite shorts via mechanical blocking.
- Li-ion conducting glass or glass-ceramic materials are (generally) readily reduced by lithium metal, and therefore a thin film of a stable lithium conducting material, such as Li_{3}P or Li_{3}N, can be inserted between the ceramic and metal. This ceramic-based SEI inhibits the formation of dendrites and protects the lithium metal from atmospheric contamination.

=== Cathode ===
At the cathode during charge, oxygen donates electrons to the lithium via reduction. Mesoporous carbon has been used as a cathode substrate with metal catalysts that enhance reduction kinetics and increase the cathode's specific capacity. Manganese, cobalt, ruthenium, platinum, silver, or a mixture of cobalt and manganese are potential metal catalysts. Under some circumstances manganese-catalyzed cathodes performed best, with a specific capacity of 3,137 mA·H/g carbon and cobalt-catalyzed cathodes performed second best, with a specific capacity of 2414 mA·H/g carbon. Based on the first pore-scale modeling of lithium–air batteries, the micro-structure of the cathode significantly affects battery capacity in both non-pore-blocking and pore-blocking regimes.

Most Li–air battery limits are at the cathode, which is also the source of its potential advantages. Atmospheric oxygen must be present at the cathode, but contaminants such as water vapor can damage it. Incomplete discharge due to blockage of the porous carbon cathode with discharge products such as lithium peroxide (in aprotic designs) is the most serious.

Catalysts have shown promise in creating preferential nucleation of Li_{2}O_{2} over Li_{2}O, which is irreversible with respect to lithium.

Li–air performance is limited by the efficiency of the reaction at the cathode, because most of the voltage drop occurs there. Multiple chemistries have been assessed, distinguished by their electrolyte. This discussion focuses on aprotic and aqueous electrolytes as solid-state electrochemistry is poorly understood.

In a cell with an aprotic electrolyte lithium oxides are produced through reduction at the cathode:

Li^{+} + e^{−} + O_{2} + * → LiO_{2}*
Li^{+} + e^{−} + LiO_{2}* → Li_{2}O_{2}*

where "*" denotes a surface site on Li_{2}O_{2} where growth proceeds, which is essentially a neutral Li vacancy in the Li_{2}O_{2} surface.

Lithium oxides are insoluble in aprotic electrolytes, which leads to cathode clogging.

An experimental MnO_{2} nanowire array cathode augmented by a genetically modified M13 bacteriophage virus offered two to three times the energy density of 2015-era lithium-ion batteries. The virus increased the size of the nanowire array, which is about 80 nm across. The resulting wires had a spiked surface. Spikes create more surface area to host reaction sites. The viral process creates a cross-linked 3D structure, rather than isolated wires, stabilizing the electrode. The viral process is water-based and takes place at room temperature.

=== Electrolyte ===
Efforts in Li–air batteries have focused on four electrolytes: aqueous acidic, aqueous alkaline, non-aqueous protic, and aprotic.

In a cell with an aqueous electrolyte the reduction at the cathode can also produce lithium hydroxide:

==== Aqueous ====
An aqueous Li–air battery consists of a lithium metal anode, an aqueous electrolyte and a porous carbon cathode. The aqueous electrolyte combines lithium salts dissolved in water. It avoids the issue of cathode clogging because the reaction products are water-soluble. The aqueous design has a higher practical discharge potential than its aprotic counterpart. However, lithium metal reacts violently with water and thus the aqueous design requires a solid electrolyte interface between the lithium and electrolyte. Commonly, a lithium-conducting ceramic or glass is used, but conductivity are generally low (on the order of 10^{−3} S/cm at ambient temperatures).

==== Acidic electrolyte ====
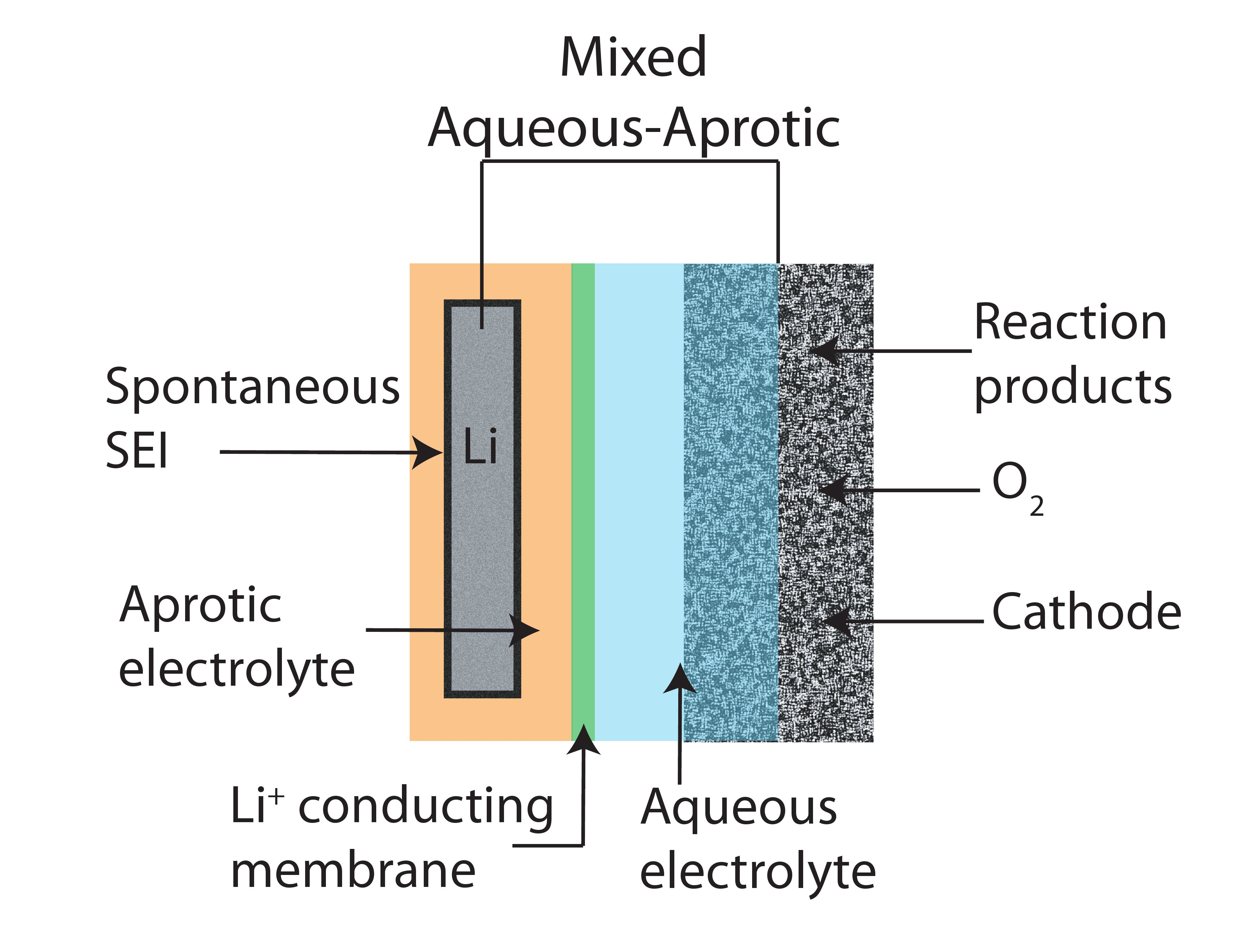
Schematic of a mixed aqueous–aprotic type Li–air battery design

2 Li + 1/2 O_{2} + 2H^{+} → 2 Li^{+}+ H_{2}O

A conjugate base is involved in the reaction. The theoretical maximal Li–air cell specific energy and energy density are 1,400 W·h/kg and 1,680 W·h/L, respectively.

==== Alkaline aqueous electrolyte ====
2 Li + 1/2 O_{2} + H_{2}O → 2 LiOH

Water molecules are involved in the redox reactions at the air cathode. The theoretical maximal Li–air cell specific energy and energy density are 1,300 W·h/kg and 1,520 W·h/L, respectively.

New cathode materials must account for the accommodation of substantial amounts of LiO_{2}, Li_{2}O_{2} and/or LiOH without causing the cathode pores to block and employ suitable catalysts to make the electrochemical reactions energetically practical.

- Dual pore system materials offer the most promising energy capacity.

- The first pore system serves as an oxidation product store.
- The second pore system serves as oxygen transport.

==== Aprotic ====
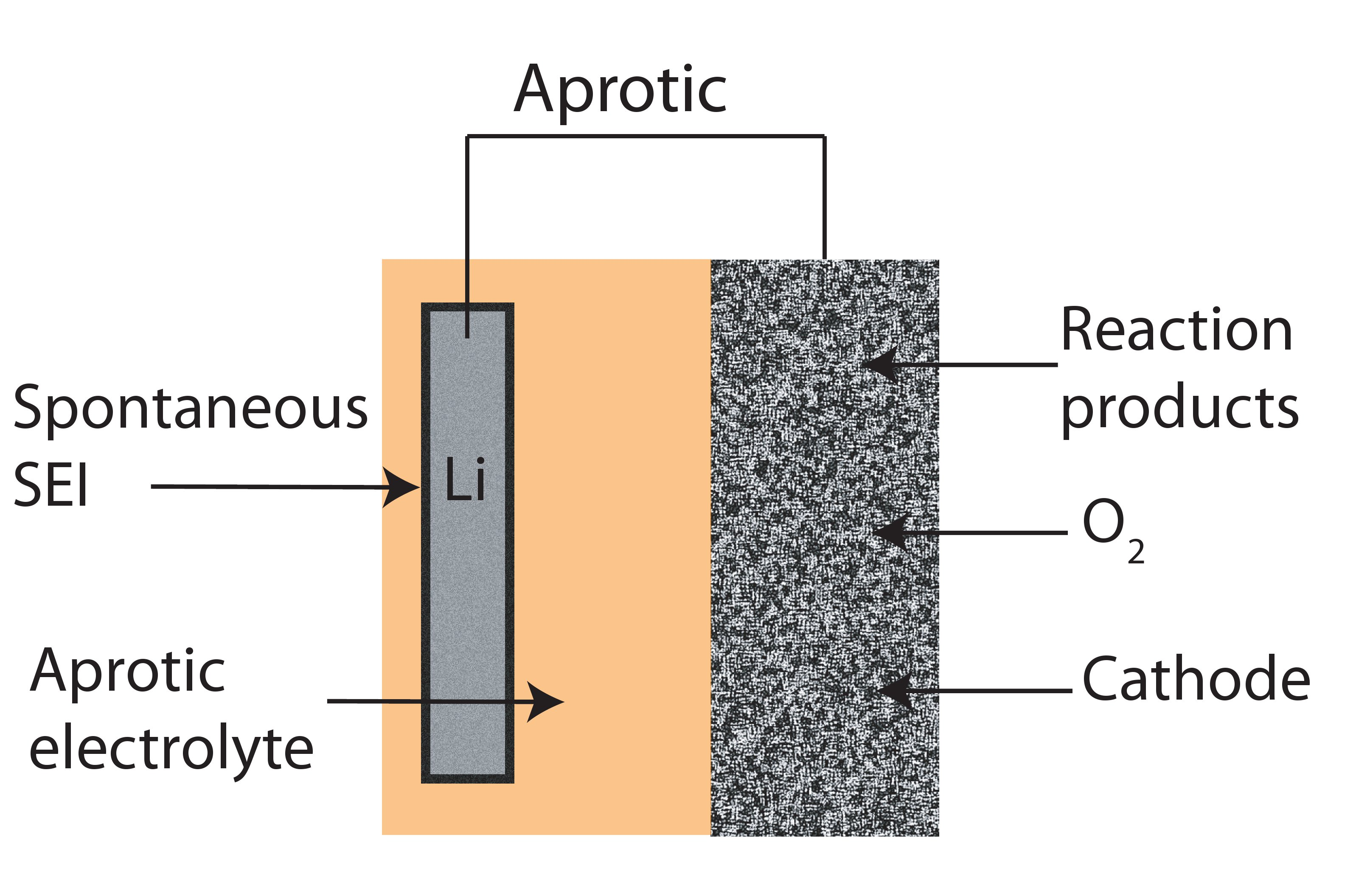
Schematic of aprotic type Li–air battery design

Non-aqueous Li–air batteries were demonstrated first. They usually use mixed ethylene carbonate+ propylene carbonate solvents with LiPF_{6} or Li bis-sulfonimide salts like conventional Li-ion batteries, however, with a gelled rather than liquid electrolyte. The voltage difference upon constant current charge and discharge is usually between 1.3 and 1.8 V (with an OCP of ca. 4.2 V) even at such low currents as 0.01–0.5 mA/cm^{2} and 50–500 mA/g of C on the positive electrode (see Figure 2), However, the carbonate solvents evaporate and get oxidized due to a high overvoltage upon charge. Other solvents, such as end-capped glymes, DMSO, dimethylacetamide, and ionic liquids, have been considered. The carbon cathode gets oxidized above +3.5 V v Li during charge, forming Li_{2}CO_{3}, which leads to an irreversible capacity loss.

Most efforts involved aprotic materials, which consist of a lithium metal anode, a liquid organic electrolyte and a porous carbon cathode. The electrolyte can be made of any organic liquid able to solvate lithium salts such as LiPF_{6}, LiAsF_{6}, LiN(SO_{2}CF_{3})_{2}, and LiSO_{3}CF_{3}, but typically consisted of carbonates, ethers and esters. The carbon cathode is usually made of a high-surface-area carbon material with a nanostructured metal oxide catalyst (commonly MnO_{2} or Mn_{3}O_{4}). A major advantage is the spontaneous formation of a barrier between anode and electrolyte (analogous to the barrier formed between electrolyte and carbon–lithium anodes in conventional Li-ion batteries) that protects the lithium metal from further reaction with the electrolyte. Although rechargeable, the Li_{2}O_{2} produced at the cathode is generally insoluble in the organic electrolyte, leading to a buildup along the cathode/electrolyte interface. This makes cathodes in aprotic batteries prone to clogging and volume expansion that progressively reduces conductivity and degrades battery performance. Another issue is that organic electrolytes are flammable and can ignite if the cell is damaged.

Although most studies agree that Li_{2}O_{2} is the final discharge product of non-aqueous Li-O_{2} batteries, considerable evidence that its formation does not proceed as a direct 2-electron electro-reduction to peroxide O^{2−}_{2} (which is the common pathway for O_{2} reduction in water on carbon) but rather via a one–electron reduction to superoxide O^{−}_{2}, followed by its disproportionation:

2 LiO_{2} ⇌ Li_{2}O_{2} + O_{2}	1

Traditionally, superoxide (O^{−}_{2}) was considered as a dangerous intermediate in aprotic oxygen batteries due to its high nucleophilicity, basicity and redox potential However, reports suggest that LiO_{2} is both an intermediate during the discharge to peroxide (Li_{2}O_{2}) and can be used as the final discharge product, potentially with an improved cycle life albeit with a lower specific energy (a little heavier battery weight). Indeed, it was shown that under certain conditions, the superoxide can be stable on the scale of 20–70 h at room temperature. An irreversible capacity loss upon disproportionation of LiO_{2} in the charged battery was not addressed.

Pt/C seems to be the best electrocatalyst for O_{2} evolution and Au/C for O_{2} reduction when Li_{2}O_{2} is the product. Nevertheless, "the performance of rechargeable lithium–air batteries with non-aqueous electrolytes is limited by the reactions on the oxygen electrode, especially by O_{2} evolution. Conventional porous carbon air electrodes are unable to provide mAh/g and mAh/cm^{2} capacities and discharge rates at the magnitudes required for really high energy density batteries for EV applications." The capacity (in mAh/cm^{2}) and the cycle life of non-aqueous Li-O_{2} batteries is limited by the deposition of insoluble and poorly electronically conducting LiOx phases upon discharge. (Li_{3}O_{4} is predicted to have a better Li+ conductivity than the LiO_{2} and Li_{2}O_{2} phases). This makes the practical specific energy of Li-O_{2} batteries significantly smaller than the reagent-level calculation predicts. It seems that these parameters have reached their limits, and further improvement is expected only from alternative methods.

==== Mixed aqueous–aprotic ====
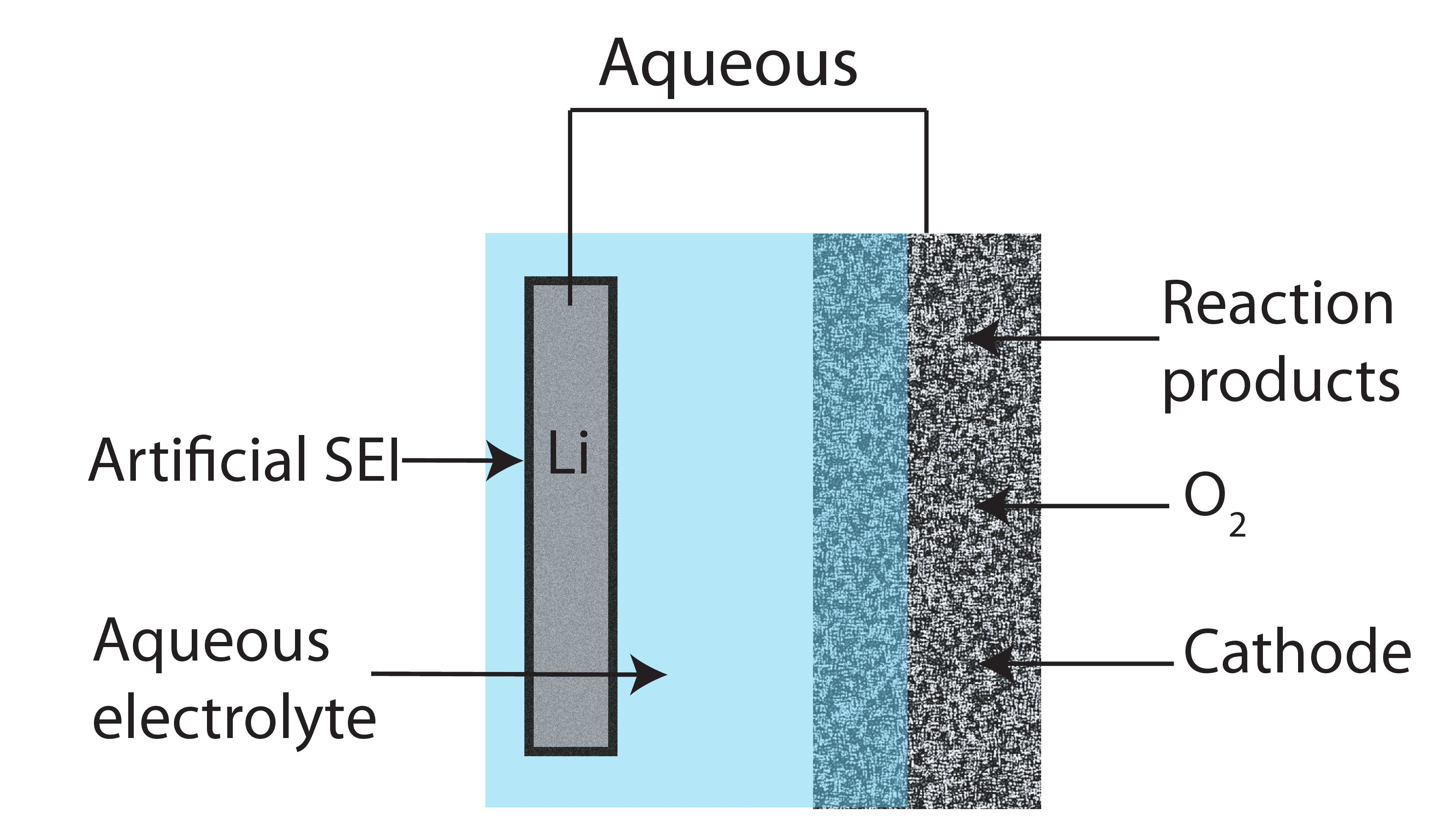
Schematic of aqueous type Li–air battery design

The aqueous–aprotic or mixed Li–air battery design attempts to unite advantages of the aprotic and aqueous battery designs. The common feature of hybrid designs is a two-part (one part aqueous and one part aprotic) electrolyte connected by a lithium-conducting membrane. The anode abuts the aprotic side while the cathode is in contact with the aqueous side. A lithium-conducting ceramic is typically employed as the membrane joining the two electrolytes.

The use of a solid electrolyte (see Fig. 3) is one such alternative approaches that allows for a combination of a lithium metal anode with an aqueous cathode. Ceramic solid electrolytes (CSEs) of the NASICON family (e.g., Li_{1−x}A_{x}M_{2−x}(PO_{4})_{3} with A ∈ [Al, Sc, Y] and M ∈ [Ti, Ge]) has been studied. Compatible with water at alkaline pH and having a large electrochemical window (see Figs. 3,4), their low Li+ ion conductivity near room temperature (< 0.005 S/cm, >85 Ω cm^{2}) makes them unsuitable for automotive and stationary energy storage applications that demand low cost (i.e., operating current densities over 100 mA/cm^{2}). Further, both Ti and Ge are reduced by metallic Li, and an intermediate layer between the ceramic electrode and the negative electrode is required. In contrast, solid polymer electrolytes (SPEs) can provide a higher conductivity at the expense of a faster crossover of water and of other small molecules that are reactive toward metallic Li. Among the more exotic membranes considered for Li-O_{2} batteries is single-crystal silicon.

In 2015 researchers announced a design that used highly porous graphene for the anode, an electrolyte of lithium bis(trifluoromethyl) sulfonylimide/dimethoxyethane with added water and lithium iodide for use as a "mediator". The electrolyte produces lithium hydroxide (LiOH) at the cathode instead of lithium peroxide (Li_{2}O_{2}). The result offered energy efficiency of 93 percent (voltage gap of .2) and cycled more than 2,000 times with little impact on output. However, the design required pure oxygen, rather than ambient air.

==== Solid state ====
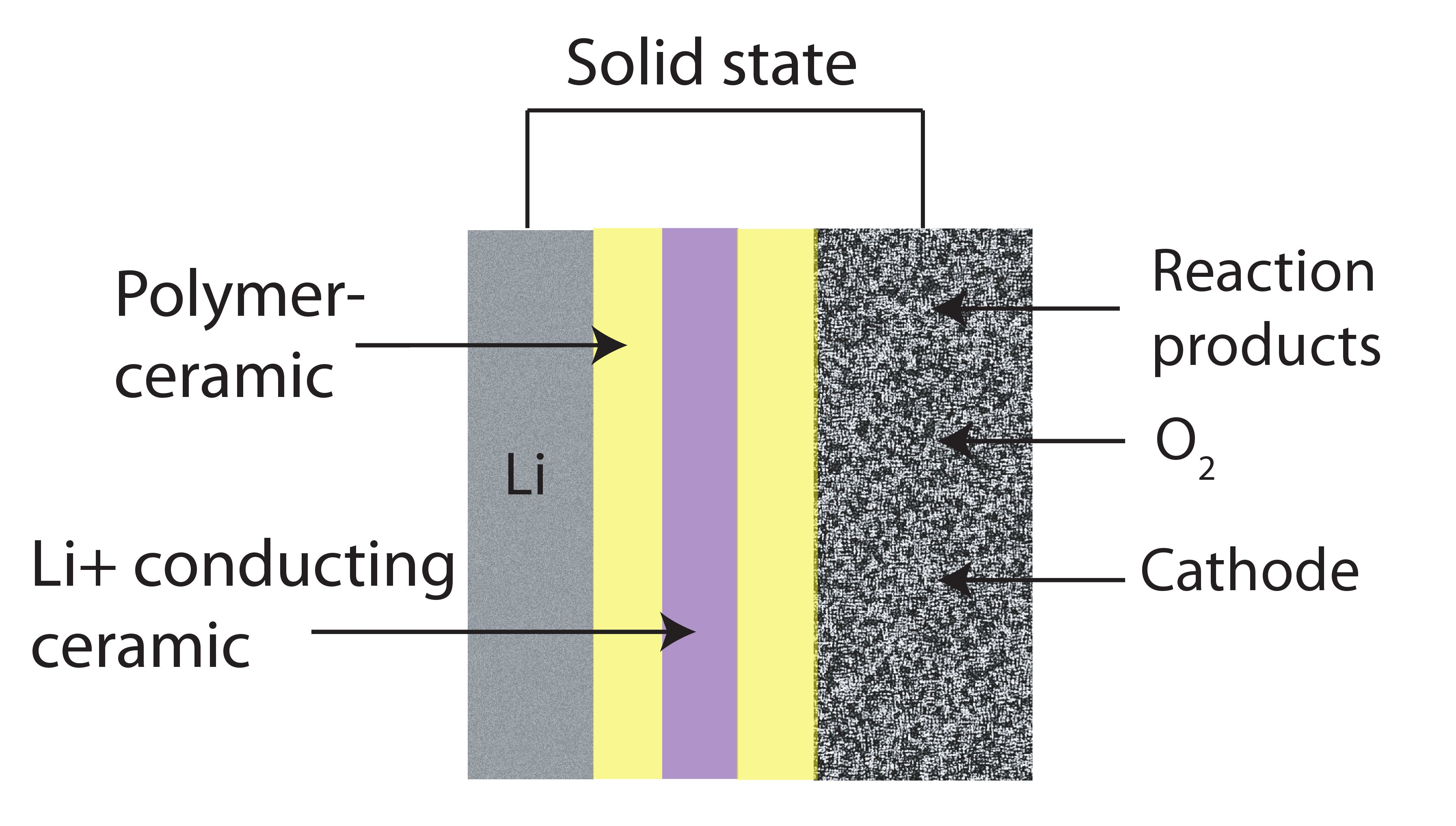
Schematic of solid-state type Li–air battery design

A solid-state battery design is attractive for its safety, eliminating the chance of ignition from rupture. Current solid-state Li–air batteries use a lithium anode, a ceramic, glass, or glass-ceramic electrolyte, and a porous carbon cathode. The anode and cathode are typically separated from the electrolyte by polymer–ceramic composites that enhance charge transfer at the anode and electrochemically couple the cathode to the electrolyte. The polymer–ceramic composites reduce overall impedance. The main drawback of the solid-state battery design is the low conductivity of most glass-ceramic electrolytes. The ionic conductivity of current lithium fast ion conductors is lower than liquid electrolyte alternatives.

== Challenges ==
As of 2013, many challenges confronted designers, particularly surface passivation and pore clogging.

Long-term battery operation requires chemical stability of all components. Current cell designs show poor resistance to oxidation by reaction products and intermediates. Many aqueous electrolytes are volatile and evaporate. Stability is further compromised by parasitic chemical reactions, for instance those involving reactive oxygen.

=== Cathode ===
Most Li–air battery limits are at the cathode, which is also the source of its potential advantages. Most prominent is incomplete discharge due to blockage of the porous carbon cathode with discharge products such as lithium peroxide (in aprotic designs). Several modes of precipitates have been modeled. A parameter, Da, was defined to measure variations of temperature, species concentration and potentials.

In addition to the blockage of electron flow via the formation of an insulating product, cycling Li-air batteries clogs pores meant for oxygen diffusion. The chemistry of a standard Li-air battery inevitably produces lithium peroxide, but the effects of pore size and pore size distribution remain poorly understood. Modulation of pore size has drastic effects on cell capacity.

Catalysts have shown promise in creating preferential nucleation of Li_{2}O_{2} over Li_{2}O, which is irreversible with respect to lithium.

Atmospheric oxygen must be present at the cathode, but contaminants such as water vapor can damage it.

=== Electrochemistry ===
In 2017 cell designs, the charge overpotential is much higher than the discharge overpotential. Significant charge overpotential indicates the presence of secondary reactions. Thus, electric efficiency is only around 65%.

Catalysts such MnO_{2}, Co, Pt and Au can potentially reduce the overpotentials, but the effect is poorly understood. Several catalysts improve cathode performance, notably MnO_{2}, and the mechanism of improvement is known as surface oxygen redox providing abundant initial growth sites for lithium peroxide. It is also reported that catalysts may alter the structure of oxide deposits.

Significant drops in cell capacity with increasing discharge rates are another issue. The decrease in cell capacity is attributed to kinetic charge transfer limits. Since the anodic reaction occurs very quickly, the charge transfer constraint is thought to occur at the cathode.

== Advancements ==
=== Pore size modulation ===
The research towards deciphering the impacts of pore size and distribution remain ongoing, but some conclusions have been made, especially regarding sets of pores smaller than 100 nm. In cells using cathodes made from Super P and Ketjen Black, for example, conclusions have been made linking to discharge being stopped in Li-air batteries due to the loss of surface area near the air inlet. As the battery is used, Lithium peroxide deposits along the walls of pores, gradually sealing them.

The reason for this focus on pores smaller than 100 nm is because smaller pores seem to be preferable in spite of their small size being easy to seal up with discharge products. To avoid the challenges in pore clogging, select amounts of large cracks or cavities are recommended in order to ensure that airflow remains in the battery even after a lot of lithium peroxide deposition into pores.

=== Alternate discharge chemistry ===
By incorporating advanced composite solid electrolytes solid-state battery design with advanced composite electrolytes (such as polyethylene oxide), it is possible to produce and decompose Lithium oxide within the battery alongside the normal discharge products. If done correctly, this can aid in the reversibility of the discharge process, resulting in a Li-air battery that can recharge for over 1000 cycles.

== Applications ==
=== Vehicles ===
Li–air cells are of interest for electric vehicles, because of their high theoretical specific and volumetric energy density, comparable to petrol. Electric motors provide high efficiency (95% compared to 35% for an internal combustion engine). Li–air cells could offer range equivalent to today's vehicles with a battery pack one-third the size of standard fuel tanks assuming the balance of plant required to maintain the battery was of negligible mass or volume.

=== Grid backup ===
In 2014, researchers from the Ohio State University announced a hybrid solar cell-battery. Up to 20% of the energy produced by conventional solar cells is lost as it travels to and charges a battery. The hybrid stores nearly 100% of the energy produced. One version of the hybrid used a potassium-ion battery using potassium–air. It offered higher energy density than conventional Li-ion batteries, cost less and avoided toxic byproducts. The latest device essentially substituted lithium for potassium.

The solar cell used a mesh made from microscopic rods of titanium dioxide to allow the needed oxygen to pass through. Captured sunlight produced electrons that decompose lithium peroxide into lithium ions, thereby charging the battery. During discharge, oxygen from air replenished the lithium peroxide.

== See also ==
- List of battery types
- Lithium-ion battery
- Lithium iron phosphate battery
- Lithium polymer battery
- Lithium-ion flow battery
- Lithium–sulfur battery
- Metal–air electrochemical cell
- Nanowire battery
- Nanopore battery
- Power-to-weight ratio
- Zinc–air battery
