= Siam 7X =

Siam 7x
- Manufacturer: CRBT Siam
- Series: Siam X Series
- Availability by region: November 27, 2015
- Form factor: Slate smartphone
- Dimensions: 142.2×70.6×8.9 mm (5.60×2.78×0.35 in)
- Weight: 170 g (6 oz)
- Operating system: Android 5.1
- CPU: MTK6735, Qual-Core, ARM 8xCortex-A53 64bit, 1.0 GHz ARM MaliT760-MP3@450MHz GPU
- Memory: 2 GB
- Storage: Up to 64 GB on TF memory card
- Battery: Nanobattery 2100 mAh
- Rear camera: 5.0 MP (Front), 16.0 MP, Auto-Focus with LED Flashlight (Back)
- Display: 5.0 inch 1280×720 px FWVGA HD IPS multi-touch (Front) 4.7 inch 960×540 px FWVGA QHD E-ink paper touch screen (Back)
- Connectivity: Bluetooth 4.0 microUSB 2.0; 3.5 mm audio jack, Built-in GPS, support for Assisted GPS; Wi-Fi 802.11 a/n/b/g/ac

The Siam 7x is an Android dual-screen smartphone which launched in December 2015 and was designed by Darius Allen. This phone was the first phone produced by CRBT Siam, and the first dual-screen phone to be marketed to American consumers.

== History ==
Several manufacturers, including Samsung, LG and Kyocera had made attempts to create a dual-screen smartphone. However, they proved unsuccessful as their second screens were located within a difficult to access clam-shell design. The Siam 7x overcame this by placing the second screen on the outside, using a black and white E Ink Corporation screen to conserve power. A similar design was created by Yotaphone but its parent company targeted this phone to European, Asian and Middle Eastern markets. The Siam 7x was the first dual-screen phone designed for the North American market.

The phone was available only with the Android operating system, and only as a GSM carrier phone. It allows users to insert two SIM cards simultaneously. The phone was designed in Dallas, and manufactured in Shenzhen, China.

== Hardware ==
- Processor: MTK6735A, Quad-Core Cortex A53
- GPU: ARM MaliT760-MP3@450 MHz
- Hard-drive: 16–64GB
- RAM: 2GB
- Operating System: Android 5.1
- Screen Size: 5.0" 1280 x 720 HD IPS 2.5D

Furthermore, the phone has a biometric ear print recognition system which employs the Descartes Bio-metric Helix system.

== Reception ==
The Siam 7x dual-screen smartphone was released to the public on November 27, 2015, (Black Friday). 10,000 of these phones were produced for its release date, targeting a relatively small sales volume.
