= Phinergy =

Israeli clean energy company

- Type: Public company
- Traded as: TASE: PNRG
- Industry: Battery systems
- Founded: 2009 in Israel
- Founder: Aviv Tzidon
- Headquarters: Lod, Israel
- Key people: Aviv Tzidon (Chairman), Emmanuel Levy (CEO)
- Website: phinergy.com

Phinergy is an Israeli clean energy company developing metal-air technology, turning metals – namely aluminum and zinc – into a new way to store, transport and generate clean and safe energy. Applications include energy backup for critical sites (as a replacement to lead-acid batteries or diesel generators), range extension for electric vehicles, or low-cost renewable energy storage. The company was founded in 2009 by Aviv Tzidon, currently Phinergy's Chairman. The company's CEO is Emmanuel Levy.

The company's technology originates at Bar Ilan University, and has been further developed by Phinergy, turning the technology into products for various applications.

In February 2021, Phinergy completed an IPO at the Tel Aviv Stock Exchange.

== Strategic partnerships ==
In March 2021, Phinergy and Indian Oil formed a joint venture in India for collaboration in the sector of Al-air battery system. This includes research and development, customization, assembly, manufacturing and sale of aluminium-air batteries for the Indian market, specifically electric vehicles.

== Data center backup power ==
In the 2020s Phinergy began developing its aluminium-air technology as a backup power source for data centers, as an alternative to diesel generators. On 9 October 2026 the company and the Net Zero Innovation Hub for Data Centers, an industry consortium, tested a 72 kW, 1.4 MWh aluminium-air generator module at a facility near Madison, Wisconsin, as a building block for a planned 500 kW, 10 MWh system.
