= Aluminium battery =

Battery with an aluminium electrode

Different types of aluminium-based batteries have been investigated. Several are listed below:

- Aluminium–air battery is a non-rechargeable battery. Aluminium–air batteries (Al–air batteries) produce electricity from the reaction of oxygen in the air with aluminium. They have one of the highest energy densities of all batteries, but they are not widely used because of problems with high anode cost and byproduct removal when using traditional electrolytes.
- Aluminium-ion battery is a class of rechargeable battery in which aluminium ions provide energy.
- Aluminium–chlorine battery was patented by United States Air Force in the 1970s and designed mostly for military applications. They use aluminium anodes and chlorine on graphite substrate cathodes. Elevated temperatures are required for these batteries to be operational.
- Aluminium–sulfur battery was worked on by American researchers with great claims, although it seems that these are still far from mass production. The rechargeable aluminium–sulfur battery was first demonstrated at the University of Maryland in 2016. In August 2022 MIT researchers claimed they had developed a new type of low cost inorganic ionic liquid electrolyte aluminium–sulphur battery operating at an ideal temperature of 110 degrees Celsius. In 2024, researchers reported operating an aluminium–sulphur battery with a quaternary alkali chloroaluminate melt electrolyte below the boiling point of water, at 85 degrees Celsius.
- Al–Fe–O, Al–Cu–O and Al–Fe–OH batteries were proposed by some researchers for military hybrid vehicles. Corresponding practical specific energies claimed are 455, 440 and 380 Wh/kg.
- Al–MnO manganese-dioxide battery using acidic electrolyte. These produce a high voltage of 1.9 volts. Another variation uses a base (potassium hydroxide) as the anolyte and sulfuric acid as the catholyte. The two parts being separated by a slightly permeable film to avoid mixing of the electrolyte in both half cells. This configuration gives a high voltage of 2.6–2.85 volts.
- Al–glass system. As reported in an Italian patent by Baiocchi, in the interface between common silica glass and aluminium foil (with the other electrode of stainless steel but no other components required) at a temperature near the melting point of the metal, an electric voltage is generated with an electric current passing through when the system is closed onto a resistive load. The phenomenon was first observed by Baiocchi, and later Dell'Era et al (2013) began the study and the characterization of this electrochemical system.
