= Emim =

Emim or EMIM may refer to:

- Emite, one of the tribes of Rephaim
- 1-Ethyl-3-methylimidazolium chloride
- EMIM, an ICSU code, for EMigration/IMmigration. See human migration
