= Silicon battery =

The term Silicon battery may refer to the following battery technologies:

- Lithium–silicon battery, a battery containing a silicon anode
  - Solid-state silicon battery, a battery containing a silicon anode and a solid-state electrolyte
  - A silicon-containing nanowire battery
- Silicon–air battery
