= Aluminium-ion battery =

Type of battery

Aluminium-ion batteries (AIB) are a class of rechargeable battery in which aluminium ions serve as charge carriers. Aluminium can exchange three electrons per ion. This means that insertion of one Al^{3+} is equivalent to three Li^{+} ions. Thus, since the ionic radii of Al^{3+} (0.54 Å) and Li^{+} (0.76 Å) are similar, significantly higher numbers of electrons and Al^{3+} ions can be accepted by cathodes with little damage. Al has 50 times (23.5 megawatt-hours m^{-3)} the energy density of Li-ion batteries and is even higher than coal.

The trivalent charge carrier, Al^{3+} is both the advantage and disadvantage of this battery. While transferring 3 units of charge by one ion significantly increases the energy storage capacity, the electrostatic intercalation of the electrodes with a trivalent cation is too strong for well-defined electrochemical behaviour. Theoretically, the gravimetric capacity of Al-ion batteries is 2980 mAh/g while its volumetric capacity would be 8046 mAh/ml for the dissolution of Al to Al^{3+}. In reality, however, the redox reaction is more complicated and involves other reactants such as AlCl_{4}^{−}. When this is taken into account, theoretical gravimetric capacity becomes 67 mAh/g.

Rechargeable aluminium-based batteries offer the possibilities of low cost and low flammability, together with high capacity. The inertness and ease of handling of aluminium in an ambient environment offer safety improvements compared with Li-ion batteries. Al-ion batteries can be smaller and may also have more charge-discharge cycles. Thus, Al-ion batteries have the potential to replace Li-ion batteries.

== History ==
Aluminum electrodes date back to the 1850s, appearing as a cathode in an 1855 Zn(Hg)/H2SO4/Al battery and an anode in an 1857 nitric acid cell (Al/HNO3/C). These early designs were non-rechargeable. First rechargeable aluminum battery appeared in 1972, when a system using molten salt was developed. The high working temperature made this cell impractical, and researchers subsequently focused on room-temperature ionic liquid electrolytes. In 2011, Jayaprakash et al. produced a working secondary cell using a vanadium pentoxide cathode and a chloride-based electrolyte. Although the prototype failed after 20 cycles, it established the electrolyte chemistry used in later work, including the stable Al/graphite battery developed by Lin et al. in 2015.

== Design ==
Like all other batteries, aluminium-ion batteries include two electrodes connected by an electrolyte. Unlike lithium-ion batteries, where the mobile ion is Li^{+}, aluminium forms a complex with chloride in most electrolytes and generates an anionic mobile charge carrier, usually AlCl_{4}^{−} or Al_{2}Cl_{7}^{−}.

The amount of energy or power that a battery can release is dependent on factors including the battery cell's voltage, capacity and chemical composition. A battery can maximize its energy output levels by:

- Increasing chemical potential difference between the two electrodes
- Reducing the mass of reactants
- Preventing the electrolyte from being modified by the chemical reactions

=== Electrolyte ===
Since 2020, the most commonly used electrolyte for rechargeable Al batteries have been acidic room temperature non-aqueous ionic liquids (IL) made of aluminium chloride (AlCl_{3}) and 1-ethyl-3-methylimidazolium chloride (C_{6}H_{11}ClN_{2}). This addressed the initial issue that prevented Al batteries from becoming rechargeable: Al readily reacts to form a passivating oxide coating that is chemically inert and an extremely high potential is necessary to push ions through this layer. This high potential would degrade the electrolyte during recharging. The use of the ionic liquid as an electrolyte prevents passivation and allowed Al batteries to become rechargeable. As mentioned earlier, the active species in the IL electrolyte are AlCl_{4}^{−} and Al_{2}Cl_{7}^{−}.

This electrolyte also faces multiple challenges. In the forefront of those challenges is its sensitivity to moisture. The electrolyte and water exothermically react to form gasses such as H_{2}, Cl_{2}, and HCl, which cause cell expansion/distortion and reduction in performance (lower Coulombic efficiency, irreversible decay of capacity). The end result is an unstable cell, safety issues due to leakage and corrosion, and more complex and costly manufacturing requirements. Liquid electrolytes have also faced issues such as poor electrode-electrolyte interface. All these issues have limited practical application of the cell.

Some have addressed these issues by replacing the liquid IL with a gel IL electrolyte. The gel IL makes use of a polymer framework that helps mitigate the effects of moisture by inhibiting the IL from reacting with water. This solution has faced its own problems, e.g. the relatively poor mechanical strength of the polymer, and while it does reduce moisture sensitivity, the problem persists. Another solution that has been of interest is the use of quasi-solid-state or solid-state electrolytes. An example of a quasi-solid-state electrolyte is the use of a zirconium-based metal organic framework (MOF) impregnated with the IL like in the work of Huang et al. The MOF provides protection to the IL by reducing contact with moisture. Aside from improving moisture stability, the added advantage of this solution is its increased safety and flexible architecture.

In general, the electrolyte for rechargeable Al batteries needs to satisfy the following requirements:

1. Have an appropriately ranged electrochemical window where side reactions of the main redox reaction do not occur
2. Have no side reactions with the electrodes or any intermediate product
3. Be an electron-insulator but an ion-conductor. That is, it must block electron flow but allow ions to pass through it.
4. Solvation (interaction with solvent molecules) and desolvation (interaction with active ions) should be moderate. If it is too weak, it would not be able to dissolve the salts. If it is too strong, the activation energy will be too high.

== Lithium-ion comparison ==
Aluminium-ion batteries are conceptually similar to lithium-ion batteries, except that aluminium is the charge carrier instead of lithium. While the theoretical voltage for aluminium-ion batteries is lower than lithium-ion batteries, 2.65 V and 4 V respectively, the theoretical energy density potential for aluminium-ion batteries is 1060 Wh/kg in comparison to lithium-ion's 406 Wh/kg limit.

Today's lithium-ion batteries have high power density (fast charge/discharge) and high energy density (hold a lot of charge). They can also develop dendrites that can short-circuit and catch fire, whereas the non-volatile and nonflammable ionic liquid electrolyte in the aluminium battery improves its safety. The use of an Al metal anode as opposed to Li metal also provides increased safety due to the former having better air stability. Aluminium also transfers energy more efficiently because of its 3 electrons. Aluminium is more abundant and therefore costs less than lithium, lowering material costs.

== Challenges ==
Aluminium-ion batteries to date have a relatively short shelf life. The combination of heat, rate of charge, and cycling can dramatically affect energy capacity. One of the reasons is the fracture of the graphite anode. Aluminium atoms are far larger than lithium atoms.

Ionic liquid electrolytes, while improving safety and the long term stability of the devices by minimizing corrosion, are expensive and may therefore be unsuitable. However, recent advances in research have introduced safer and less expensive kinds of aluminium-ion batteries. This includes a "high safety, high voltage, low cost" aluminium-ion battery introduced in 2015 that uses carbon paper as the cathode, high purity aluminum foil as the anode, and an ionic liquid as the electrolyte.

== Research ==
Various research teams are experimenting with aluminium to produce better batteries. Requirements include cost, durability, capacity, charging speed, and safety.

=== Anode ===
==== Cornell University ====
In 2021, researchers announced a cell that used a 3D structured anode in which layers of aluminium accumulate evenly on an interwoven carbon fiber structure via covalent bonding as the battery is charged. The thicker anode features faster kinetics, and the prototype operated for 10k cycles without signs of failure.

=== Electrolyte ===
==== Oak Ridge National Laboratory ====
Around 2010, Oak Ridge National Laboratory (ORNL) developed and patented a high energy density device, producing 1,060 watt-hours per kilogram (Wh/kg). ORNL used an ionic electrolyte, instead of the typical aqueous electrolyte which can produce hydrogen gas and corrode the anode. The electrolyte was made of 3-ethyl-1-methylimidazolium chloride with excess aluminium trichloride. However, ionic electrolytes are less conductive, reducing power density. Reducing anode/cathode separation can offset the limited conductivity, but causes heating. ORNL devised a cathode made up of spinel manganese oxide that further reduced corrosion.

=== Cathode ===
==== Cornell University ====
In 2011 a research team used the same electrolyte as ORNL, but used vanadium oxide nanowires for the cathode. Vanadium oxide has an open crystal structure with greater surface area and reduced path between cathode and anode. The device produced a large output voltage. However, the battery had a low coulombic efficiency.

==== Stanford University ====
In April 2015 researchers at Stanford University claimed to have developed an aluminium-ion battery with a recharge time of about one minute (for an unspecified battery capacity). Their cell provides about 2 volts, 4 volts if connected in a series of two cells. The prototype lasted over 7,500 charge-discharge cycles with no loss of capacity.

The battery was made of an aluminium anode, liquid electrolyte, isolation foam, and a graphite cathode. During the charging process, AlCl_{4}^{−} ions intercalate among the graphene stacked layers. While discharging, AlCl_{4}^{−} ions rapidly de-intercalate through the graphite. The cell displayed high durability, withstanding more than 10,000 cycles without a capacity decay. The cell was stable, nontoxic, bendable and nonflammable.

In 2016, the lab tested these cells through collaborating with Taiwan's Industrial Technology Research Institute (ITRI) to power a motorbike using an expensive electrolyte. In 2017, a urea-based electrolyte was tested that was about 1% of the cost of the 2015 model. The battery exhibits ~99.7% Coulombic efficiency and a rate capability of $\ce{100 mA/g}$ at a cathode capacity of $\ce{73 mAh/g}$ (1.4 C).

==== ALION Project ====
In June 2015, the High Specific Energy Aluminium-Ion Rechargeable Batteries for Decentralized Electricity Generation Sources (ALION) project was launched by a consortium of materials and component manufacturers and battery assemblers as a European Horizon 2020 project led by the LEITAT research institute. The project objective is to develop a prototype Al-ion battery that could be used for large-scale storage from decentralized sources. The project sought to achieve an energy density of 400 Wh/kg, a voltage of 48 volts and a charge-discharge life of 3000 cycles. 3D printing of the battery packs allowed for large Al-ion cells developed, with voltages ranging from 6 to 72 volts.

==== University Of Maryland ====
In 2016, a University of Maryland team reported an aluminium/sulfur battery that utilizes a sulfur/carbon composite as the cathode. The chemistry provides a theoretical energy density of 1340 Wh/kg. The prototype cell demonstrated energy density of 800 Wh/kg for over 20 cycles.

==== MIT ====
In 2022, MIT researches reported a design that used cheap and nonflammable ingredients, including an aluminium anode and a sulfur cathode, separated by a molten chloro-aluminate salt electrolyte. The prototype withstood hundreds of charge cycles, and charged quickly. They can operate at temperatures of up to 200 °C (392 °F). At 110 °C (230 °F), the batteries charged 25 times faster than at 25 °C (77 °F). This temperature can be maintained by the charge/discharge cycle. The salt has a low melting point and prevents dendrite formation. One potential application is at charging stations, where a pre-charged battery could allow the station to charge more vehicles simultaneously without a costly upgrade to the power line. Spinoff company Avanti, co-founded by one of the researchers, is attempting to commercialize the work.

==== Chalmers University of Technology and the National Institute of Chemistry in Slovenia ====
In 2019 researchers proposed using anthraquinone for the cathode in an aluminium ion battery.

==== Queensland University of Technology ====
In 2019 researchers from Queensland University of Technology developed cryptomelane based electrodes as cathode for aluminium ion battery with an aqueous electrolyte.

==== Clemson University ====
In 2017, researchers at Clemson Nanomaterials Institute used a graphene electrode to intercalate tetrachloroaluminate (AlCl^{−}_{4}). The team constructed batteries with aluminium anodes, pristine or modified few-layer graphene cathodes, and an ionic liquid with AlCl3 salt as the electrolyte. They claimed that the battery can operate over 10,000 cycles with an energy density of 200 Wh/kg.

==== Zhejiang University ====
In December 2017 a Zhejiang University team announced a battery using graphene films as cathode and metallic aluminium as anode.

The 3H3C (Trihigh Tricontinuous) design results in a graphene film cathode with excellent electrochemical properties. Liquid crystal graphene formed a highly oriented structure. High-temperature annealing under pressure produced a high-quality and high-channelling graphene structure. Claimed properties:

- Retained 91.7 percent of original capacity after 250,000 cycles.
- 1.1-second charge time.
- Temperature range: −40 to 120 °C
- Current capacity: 111 mAh/g, 400 A/g
- Bendable and non-flammable.
- Low energy density

=== Redox battery ===
Another approach to an aluminium battery is to use redox reactions to charge and discharge. The charging process converts aluminium oxide or aluminium hydroxide into ionic aluminium using electrolysis, typically at an aluminium smelter. This requires temperatures of 800 °C (1,470 °F). One report estimated possible efficiency at around 65%. Although ionic aluminium oxidizes in the presence of air, this costs less than 1% of the energy storage capacity.

Discharging the battery involves oxidizing the aluminium, typically with water at temperatures less than 100 °C. This yields aluminium hydroxide and ionic hydrogen. The latter can produce electricity via a fuel cell. The oxidation in the fuel cell generates heat, which can support space or water heating.

A higher-temperature process could support industrial applications. It operates at over 200 °C, reacting aluminium with steam to generate aluminium oxide, hydrogen and additional heat.

The ionic aluminium could be stored at the smelter. One approach charges the battery at a smelter, and discharges it wherever power and heat are needed. Alternatively, electricity could be fed into the grid at the smelter, without the need for transport, although for maximum round-trip efficiency, the heat would have to be used at the smelter site.

== See also ==
- Comparison of battery types
- List of battery types
- Aluminium–air battery
- Aluminium fluoride
- Energy density
- Metal–air electrochemical cell
- Solid state battery

== Sources ==
- Ma, Jianmin; Lu, Zhouguang; Ren, Yurong (26 February 2024). Rechargeable Battery Electrolytes: Electrochemical Energy Storage from Liquids to Solids. Royal Society of Chemistry. ISBN 978-1-83916-737-9.
