= Fluidic Energy =

Electric equipment company

- Type: Private
- Founded: 2007; 19 years ago in Tempe, Arizona
- Headquarters: Scottsdale, Arizona, United States
- Key people: Steve Scharnhorst (CEO); Ramkumar Krishnan (CTO)
- Website: fluidicenergy.com

Fluidic Energy is a corporation based in Scottsdale, Arizona, that develops metal–air rechargeable batteries. The company sells systems for energy storage applications from rural electrification to critical backup power and has strong ties throughout the US, Latin America, Asia, and Africa. In March 2015 the Company signed a deal with Caterpillar, which included an equity investment in Fluidic Energy as well as a commercial agreement to collaborate in the microgrid and telecommunications markets. Over the following year, the company announced two separate MOUs for some of the largest renewable-energy rural electrification projects of their kind. The Company is dedicating its operations to “paving the path for the smart, sustainable grid of the future.”

The company is selling its systems as a replacement for diesel generators or lead–acid batteries in markets where the electricity grid is unreliable, or remote areas without electricity access. In current applications, Fluidic is claiming significant advantages over traditional batteries. These advantages include safe systems with longer life, lower costs, higher temperature ranges and deeper depth of discharge capability.

== Financial history ==
In November 2013, the International Finance Corporation (IFC), a member of the World Bank Group announced its $7 million investment into the company. In 2013, the firm also closed a private funding round of $34.5 million, while in 2011 it raised $33.4 million.

Prior to that, Fluidic had received funding from both private sources and two grants from the Advanced Research Projects Agency–Energy (ARPA-e) of the United States Department of Energy.

Fluidic Energy has received two separate grants through the ARPA-e Office. The first ARPA-e grant of $5,133,150 was led by Arizona State University out of the FOA1 program and was focused on ionic-liquid-based metal–air batteries (MAIL batteries). The second ARPA-e grant, of $3 million was led by Fluidic out of the GRIDS program and was focused on an Advanced Multi-functional Energy Storage (AMES) system based on Fluidic's metal–air platform.

== Technology ==
Fluidic Energy's products are built around a rechargeable zinc–air battery developed initially at Arizona State University, with continued development since 2006. Development of a practical and high-cycle life zinc–air battery has long been considered a significant opportunity in the energy storage space.

One advantage of rechargeable metal–air batteries is use of oxygen from the atmosphere as oxidant in the battery. The absence of a stored solid oxidant within the cell means that, in principle, the energy density of these cells can be quite large. The use of low cost and abundant metals, such as zinc, at the anode and the absence of hermetic packaging means that the cost of metal–air batteries can be very low.

Issues related to dendrite formation at the anode and the absence of a long-life bifunctional (charge and discharge) air cathode have limited the cycle life of zinc–air systems. Solving these two challenges has long been seen as the key to success in these systems.

As of 2014, Fluidic Energy is the only company selling commercial rechargeable zinc–air battery systems. Fluidic Energy has been selling commercial backup solutions for telecom sites and in emerging regions since 2011 and has moved into microgrid and other long duration applications. Fluidic has covered a significant number of commercial outages as reported by the company on their website.

=== Description of ARPA-e "MAIL" Program ===
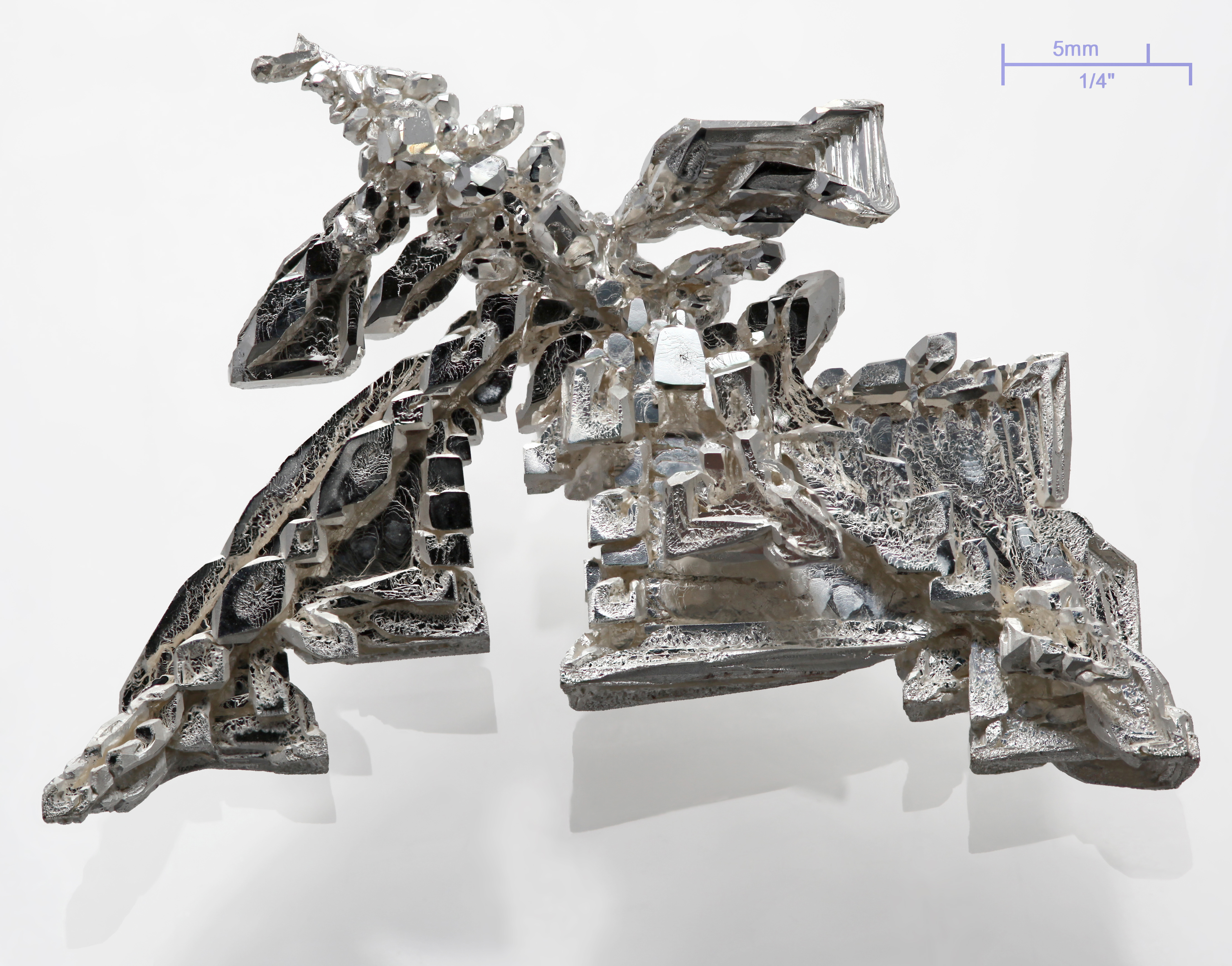
Dendrites forming as a result of crystal deposits in an electrolyte

The development efforts within this program were focused on the development of ionic liquids as the electrolyte in metal–air batteries and to overcome some of the known challenges specific to zinc–air batteries. As typically manufactured, such cells are not recharged due to dendrite buildup during the recharging cycle. The dendrites can short circuit the cell when they connect the anode with the cathode.

This concept has two significant benefits:

- Energy density – It is anticipated that this kind of cell can hold over ten times the energy density of a lithium-ion cell, currently the leader for applications requiring rechargeable batteries.
- Reduced materials costs – Compared to lithium, which is rare, zinc is readily available, and is in fact the fourth most common metal to be mined and used in the world. This could drive the cost of individual cells of roughly the same size and weight to one-third of the cost in mass production.
