= Nanobatteries =

Type of battery

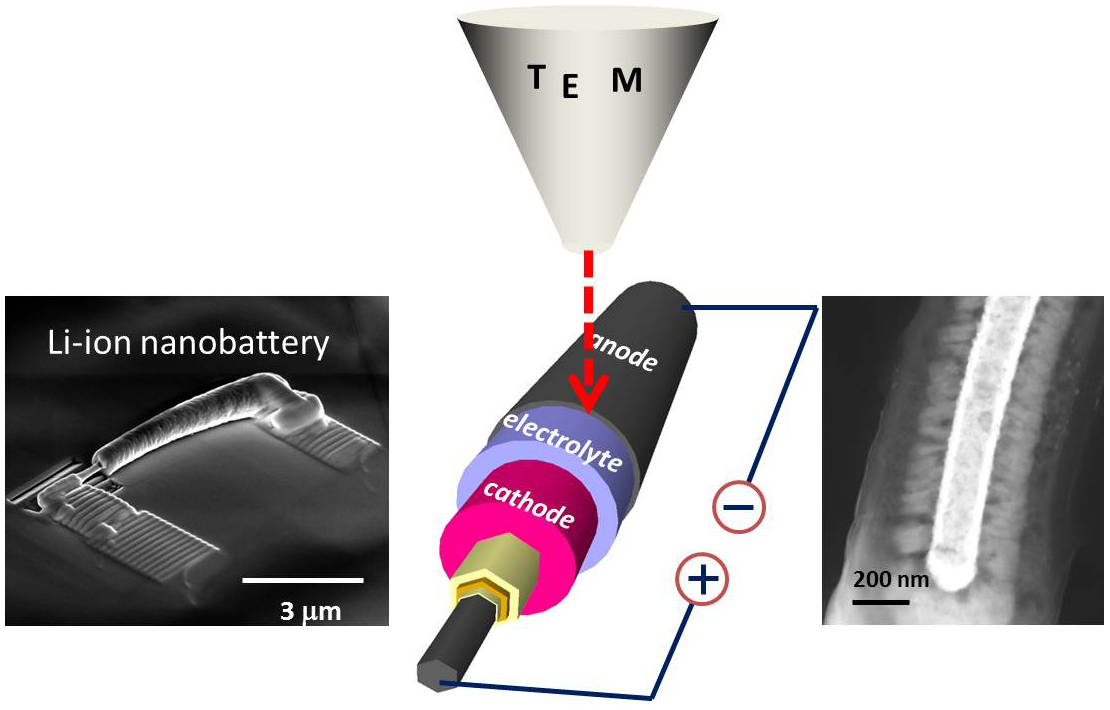
Left: A nanosized battery under Transmission Electron Spectrometry (TEM) Center and right: NIST was able to use TEM to view nanosized batteries and discovered that there probably exists a limit to how thin an electrolyte layer can be until the battery malfunctions.

Nanobatteries are fabricated batteries employing technology at the nanoscale, particles that measure less than 100 nanometers (10^{−9} meters in scale). These batteries may be nano in size or may use nanotechnology in a macro scale battery. Nanoscale batteries can be combined to function as a macrobattery such as within a nanopore battery.

Traditional lithium-ion battery technology uses active materials, such as cobalt-oxide or manganese oxide, with particles that range in size between 5 and 20 micrometers (5000 and 20000 nanometers – over 100 times nanoscale). It is hoped that nano-engineering will improve many of the shortcomings of present battery technology, such as volume expansion and power density.

== Background ==
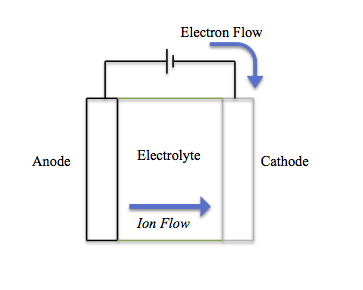
A basic schematic of how an ion battery works. The blue arrows indicate discharging. If both arrows reversed direction, the battery would be charging and this battery would then be considered a secondary (rechargeable) battery.

A battery converts chemical energy to electrical energy and is composed of three general parts:

- Anode (positive electrode)
- Cathode (negative electrode)
- Electrolyte

The anode and cathode have two different chemical potentials, which depend on the reactions that occur at either terminus. The electrolyte can be a solid or liquid that is ionically conductive. The boundary between the electrode and electrolyte is called the solid-electrolyte interphase (SEI). Connecting a circuit across the electrodes causes the chemical energy stored in the battery to be converted to electrical energy.

== Limitations of current battery technology ==
A battery's ability to store charge is dependent on its energy density and power density. It is important that charge can remain stored and that a maximum amount of charge can be stored within a battery. Cycling and volume expansion are also important considerations as well. While many other types of batteries exist, current battery technology is based on lithium-ion intercalation technology for its high power and energy densities, long cycle life and no memory effects. These characteristics have led lithium-ion batteries to be preferred over other battery types. To improve a battery technology, cycling ability and energy and power density must be maximized and volume expansion must be minimized.

During lithium intercalation, the volume of the electrode expands, causing mechanical strain. The mechanical strain compromises the structural integrity of the electrode, causing it to crack. Nanoparticles can decrease the amount of strain placed on a material when the battery undergoes cycling, as the volume expansion associated with nanoparticles is less than the volume expansion associated with microparticles. The little volume expansion associated with nanoparticles also improves the reversibility capability of the battery: the ability of the battery to undergo many cycles without losing charge.

In current lithium-ion battery technology, lithium diffusion rates are slow. Through nanotechnology, faster diffusion rates can be achieved. Nanoparticles require shorter distances for the transport of electrons, which leads to faster diffusion rates and a higher conductivity, which ultimately leads to a greater power density.

== Advantages of nanotechnology ==
Using nanotechnology to manufacture of batteries offers the following benefits:

- Increasing the available power from a battery and decreasing the time required to recharge a battery. These benefits are achieved by coating the surface of an electrode with nanoparticles, increasing the surface area of the electrode thereby allowing more current to flow between the electrode and the chemicals inside the battery.
- Nanomaterials can be used as a coating to separate the electrodes from any liquids in the battery, when the battery is not in use. In the current battery technology, the liquids and solids interact, causing a low level discharge. This decreases the shelf life of a battery.

== Disadvantages of nanotechnology ==
Nanotechnology provides its own challenges in batteries:

- Nanoparticles have low density and high surface area. The greater the surface area, the more likely reactions are to occur at the surface with the air. This serves to destabilize the materials in the battery.
- Owing to nanoparticle's low density, a higher interparticle resistance exists, decreasing the electrical conductivity of the material.
- Nanomaterials can be difficult to manufacture, increasing their cost. While nanomaterials may greatly improve the abilities of a battery, they may be cost-prohibitive to make.

== Active and past research ==
Much research has been performed surrounding lithium-ion batteries to maximize their potential. In order to properly harness clean energy resources, such as solar power, wind power and tidal energy, batteries capable of storing massive amounts of energy used in grid energy storage are required. Lithium iron phosphate electrodes are being researched for potential applications to grid energy storage.

Electric vehicles are another technology requiring improved batteries. Electric vehicle batteries currently require large charge times, effectively prohibiting the use for long-distance electric cars.

=== Nanostructured anode materials ===
==== Graphite and SEI ====
The anode in lithium-ion batteries is almost always graphite. Graphite anodes need to improve their thermal stability and create a higher power capability. Graphite and certain other electrolytes can undergo reactions that reduce the electrolyte and create an SEI (Solid Electrolyte Interphase), effectively reducing the potential of the battery. Nanocoatings at the SEI are currently being researched to stop these reactions from occurring.

In Li-ion batteries, the SEI is necessary for thermal stability, but hinders the flow of lithium ions from the electrode to the electrolyte. Park et al. have developed a nanoscale polydopamine coating such that the SEI no longer interferes with the electrode; instead the SEI interacts with the polydopamine coating.

==== Graphene and other carbon materials ====
Graphene has been studied extensively for its use in electrochemical systems such as batteries since its first isolation in 2004. Graphene offers high surface area and good conductivity. In current lithium-ion battery technology, the 2D networks of graphite inhibit smooth lithium-ion intercalation; the lithium ions must travel around the 2D graphite sheets to reach the electrolyte. This slows the charging rates of the battery. Porous graphene materials are currently being studied to improve this problem. Porous graphene involves either formation of defects in the 2D sheet or the creation of a 3D graphene-based porous superstructure.

As an anode, graphene would provide space for expansion such that the problem of volume expansion does not occur. 3D graphene has shown extremely high lithium ion extraction rates, indicating a high reversible capacity. As well, the random "house-of-cards" visualization seen below of the graphene anode would allow lithium ions to be stored not only on the internal surface of graphene, but also on the nanopores that exist between the single layers of graphene.

Raccichini et al. also outlined the drawbacks of graphene and graphene-based composites. Graphene has a large irreversible mechanism during the first lithiation step. As graphene has a large surface area, this will result in a large initial irreversibility capacity. He proposed that this drawback was so large that graphene-based cells are "unfeasible". Research is still being done on graphene in anodes.

Carbon nanotubes have been used as electrodes for batteries that use intercalation, like lithium-ion batteries, in an effort to improve capacity.

==== Titanium oxides ====
Titanium oxides are another anode material that have been researched for their applications to electric vehicles and grid energy storage. However, low electronic and ionic capabilities, as well as the high cost of titanium oxides have proven this material to be unfavorable to other anode materials.

==== Silicon-based anodes ====
Silicon-based anodes have also been researched, namely for their higher theoretical capacity than that of graphite. Silicon-based anodes have high reaction rates with the electrolyte, low volumetric capacity and an extremely large volume expansion during cycling. However, recent work has been done to decrease volume expansion in silicon-based anodes. By creating a sphere of conductive carbon around the silicon atom, Liu et al. has proven that this small structural change leaves enough room for the silicon to expand and contract without providing mechanical strain on the electrode.

=== Nanostructured cathode materials ===
Carbon nanostructures have been used to increase the capability of electrodes, namely the cathode. In LiSO_{2} batteries, carbon nanostructuring was able to theoretically increase the energy density of the battery by 70% from the current lithium-ion battery technology. In general, lithium alloys have been found to have an increased theoretical energy density than lithium ions.

Traditionally, LiCoO_{2} has been used as the cathode in lithium-ion batteries. The first successful alternative cathode for use in electric vehicles has been LiFePO_{4}. LiFePO_{4} has shown increased power density, a longer lifetime and improved safety over LiCoO_{2}.

==== Graphene ====
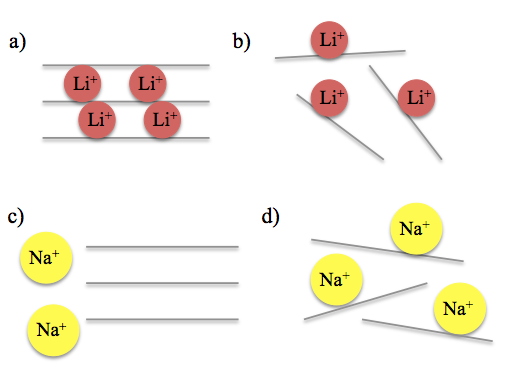
During intercalation, a) lithium ions into a graphite lattice, b) lithium ions into a graphene lattice, c) sodium ions unable to fit into a graphite lattice, d) sodium ions into a graphene lattice

Graphene could be used to improve the electrical conductivity of cathode materials. LiCoO_{2}, LiMn_{2}O_{4}and LiFePO_{4} are all commonly used cathode materials in lithium-ion batteries. These cathode materials have typically mixed with other carbon-composite materials to improve their rate capability. As graphene has a higher electrical conductivity than these other carbon-composite materials, like carbon black, graphene has a greater ability to improve these cathode materials more than other carbon-composite additives.

Piao et al. has specifically studied porous graphene in relation to just graphene. Porous graphene combined with LiFePO_{4} was advantageous over just graphene combined with LiFePO_{4}, for improved cycle stability. Porous graphene created good pore channels for the diffusion of lithium ions and prevented the buildup of LiFePO_{4} particles.

Raccichini et al. suggested graphene-based composites as cathodes in sodium-ion batteries. Sodium ions are too large to fit into the typical graphite lattice, so graphene would allow sodium ions to intercalate. Graphene has also been suggested to fix some of the problems related to lithium-sulphur batteries. Problems associated with lithium sulphur batteries include dissolution of the intermediate in the electrolyte, large volume expansion and poor electrical conductivity. Graphene has been mixed with sulphur at the cathode in an attempt to improve the capacity, stability and conductivity of these batteries.

=== Conversion electrodes ===
Conversion electrodes are electrodes where chemical ionic bonds are broken and reformed. A transformation of the crystalline structure of the molecules also occurs. In conversion electrodes, three lithium ions can be accommodated for every metal ion, whereas the current intercalation technology can only accommodate one lithium ion for every metal ion. Larger lithium to metal ion ratios indicate increased battery capacity. A disadvantage of conversion electrodes is its large voltage hysteresis.

=== Mapping ===
Balke et al. is aiming to understand the intercalation mechanism for lithium-ion batteries at the nanoscale. This mechanism is understood at the microscale, but behavior of matter changes depending on the size of the material. Zhu et al. are also mapping the intercalation of lithium ions at the nanoscale using scanning probe microscopy.

Mathematical models for lithium battery intercalation have been calculated and are still under investigation. Whittingham suggested that there was no single mechanism by which lithium ions move through the electrolyte of the battery. The movement depended on a variety of factors including, but not limited to, particle size, the thermodynamic state or metastable state of the battery and whether the reaction operated continuously. Their experimental data for LiFePO_{4} – FePO_{4} suggested the movement of Li-ions in a curved path rather than a linear straight jump within the electrolyte.

Intercalation mechanisms have been studied for polyvalent cations as well. Lee et al. has studied and determined the proper intercalation mechanism for rechargeable zinc batteries.

=== Stretchable electronics ===
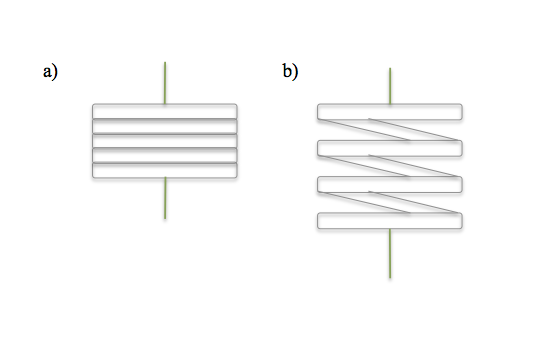
These fiber-like electrodes are wound like springs to get their flexibility. a) is an unstretched spring and b) is a partially stretched spring, showing how pliant these fibers are.

Research has also been done to use carbon nanotube fiber springs as electrodes. LiMn_{2}O_{4} and Li_{4}Ti_{5}O_{12} are the nanoparticles that have been used as the cathode and anode respectively, and have demonstrated the ability to stretch 300% of their original length. Applications for stretchable electronics include energy storage devices and solar cells.

=== Printable batteries ===
Researchers at the University of California, Los Angeles have successfully developed a "nanotube ink" for manufacturing flexible batteries using printed electronics techniques. A network of carbon nanotubes has been used as a form of electronically conducting nanowires in the cathode of a zinc-carbon battery. Using nanotube ink, the carbon cathode tube and manganese oxide electrolyte components of the zinc-carbon battery can be printed as different layers on a surface, over which an anode layer of zinc foil can be printed. This technology replaces charge collectors like metal sheets or films with a random array of carbon nanotubes. The carbon nanotubes add conductance. Thin and flexible batteries can be manufactured that are less than a millimeter thick.

Although discharge currents of the batteries are at present below the level of practical use, the nanotubes in the ink allow the charge to conduct more efficiently than in a conventional battery, such that the nanotube technology could lead to improvements in battery performance. Technology like this is applicable to solar cells, supercapacitors, light-emitting diodes and smart radio frequency identification (RFID) tags.

== Researching companies ==
=== Toshiba ===
By using nanomaterial, Toshiba has increased the surface area of the lithium and widened the bottleneck, allowing the particles to pass through the liquid and recharge the battery more quickly. Toshiba states that it tested a new battery by discharging and fully recharging one thousand times at 77 °C and found that it lost only one percent of its capacity, an indication of a long battery life. °C Toshiba's battery is 3.8 mm thick, 62 mm high and 35 mm deep.

=== A123Systems ===
A123Systems has also developed a commercial nano Li-ion battery. A123 Systems claims their battery has the widest temperature range at -30 .. +70 °C. Much like Toshiba's nanobattery, A123 Li-ion batteries charge to "high capacity" in five minutes. Safety is a key feature touted by the A123 technology, with a video on their website of a nail drive test, in which a nail is driven through a traditional Li-ion battery and an A123 Li-ion battery, where the traditional battery flames up and bubbles at one end, the A123 battery simply emits a wisp of smoke at the penetration site. Thermal conductivity is another selling point for the A123 battery, with the claim that the A123 battery offers 4 times higher thermal conductivity than conventional Lithium-Ion cylindrical cells. The nanotechnology they employ is a patented nanophosphate technology.

=== Valence ===
Also in the market is Valence Technology, Inc. The technology they are marketing is Saphion Li-ion technology. Like A123, they are using a nanophosphate technology, and different active materials than traditional Li-ion batteries.

=== Altair ===
AltairNano has also developed a nanobattery with a one-minute recharge. The advance that Altair claims to have made is in the optimization of nano-structured lithium titanate spinel oxide (LTO).

=== U.S. Photonics ===
U.S. Photonics is in the process of developing a nanobattery utilizing "environmentally friendly" nanomaterials for both the anode and cathode as well as arrays of individual nano-sized cell containers for the solid polymer electrolyte. U.S. Photonics has received a National Science Foundation SBIR phase I grant for development of nanobattery technology.

=== Sony ===
Produced the first cobalt-based lithium-ion battery in 1991. Since the inception of this first Li-ion battery, the research of nanobatteries has been underway with Sony continuing their strides into the nanobattery field.

== See also ==
- Supercapacitor
- Nanoelectronics
- Nanotechnology
- List of battery types
