= Aluminium–air battery =

High-electrical energy density storage device

- Specific energy: 4,560 W·h/kg (demonstrated); 8,100 W·h/kg (theoretical)
- Energy density: N/A
- Specific power: 200 W/kg
- Nominal cell voltage: 1.2–1.65 V

Aluminium–air batteries (Al–air batteries) are batteries which produce electricity from the reaction of oxygen in the air with aluminium. They have one of the highest energy densities of all batteries, but they are not widely used because of problems with high anode cost and byproduct removal when using traditional electrolytes. This has restricted their use to mainly military applications. However, an electric vehicle with aluminium batteries has the potential for up to eight times the range of a lithium-ion battery with a significantly lower total weight.

Aluminium–air batteries are primary cells, i.e., non-rechargeable. Once the aluminium anode is consumed by its reaction with atmospheric oxygen at a cathode immersed in a water-based electrolyte to form hydrated aluminium oxide, the battery will no longer produce electricity. However, it is possible to mechanically recharge the battery with new aluminium anodes made from recycling the hydrated aluminium oxide. Such recycling would be essential if aluminium–air batteries were to be widely adopted.

Aluminium-powered vehicles have been under discussion for some decades. Hybridisation mitigates the costs, and in 1989 road tests of a hybridised aluminium–air/lead–acid battery in an electric vehicle were reported. An aluminium-powered plug-in hybrid minivan was demonstrated in Ontario in 1990.

In March 2013, Phinergy released a video demonstration of an electric car using aluminium–air cells driven 330 km (210 mi) using a special cathode and potassium hydroxide. On May 27, 2013, the Israeli channel 10 evening news broadcast showed a car with Phinergy battery in the back, claiming 2,000 kilometres (1,200 mi) range before replacement of the aluminium anodes is necessary.

== Electrochemistry ==
The anode oxidation half-reaction is Al + 3OH^{−} → Al(OH)_{3} + 3e^{−} -2.31 V.

The cathode reduction half-reaction is O_{2} + 2H_{2}O + 4e^{−} → 4OH^{−} +0.40 V.

The total reaction is 4Al + 3O_{2} + 6H_{2}O → 4Al(OH)_{3} +2.71 V.

About 1.2 volts potential difference is created by these reactions and is achievable in practice when potassium hydroxide is used as the electrolyte. Saltwater electrolyte achieves approximately 0.7 volts per cell.

The specific voltage of the cell can vary depending upon the composition of the electrolyte as well as the structure and materials of the cathode.

Other metals can be used in a similar way, such as lithium-air, zinc-air, manganese-air, and sodium-air, some with a higher energy density. However, aluminium is attractive as the most stable metal.

== Anode ==
Aluminium (Al) has been widely used as an anode material in metal-air batteries due to its high energy density, recyclability, and abundance. However, challenges with Al anodes include corrosion and passivation. Impurities in commercially available aluminium lead to the formation of layers that impair performance. Corrosion reactions produce hydrogen and form aluminium hydroxides, while the formation of an oxide film upon exposure to air or water further limits functionality.

Improving Al anode performance involves optimizing grain size and crystal orientation, as finer grain structures enhance corrosion resistance and electrochemical activity. The study done by Fan and Lu examined the relation between the grain size and the anode performance. In this study, aluminium anodes with finer grain sizes were created using a method called Equal Channel Angular Pressing (ECAP). As the number of extrusion passes increased, the grains became smaller and more uniform. However, the process had limitations due to heat from deformation causing some grain growth. The results showed that refining the grain size improved the anode's electrochemical activity, reduced corrosion, and increased polarization and charge-transfer resistance. Tests confirmed that the anode with fine grains performed better than one with larger grains. The fine-grain structure also provided better anti-corrosion properties and enhanced battery performance in a 4 mol/L NaOH solution. At a current density of 10 mA/cm^{2}, the fine-grain anode showed a 41.5% increase in capacity density and a 55.5% increase in energy density compared to the coarse-grain anode. Besides microstructure optimization, processing of the anodes can also impact the performance. Anodes fabricated using laser sintering show increased capacity compared to non-sintered samples, which highlights the importance of processing of the anode in terms of the anode performance.

In addition to refining the microstructure and developing better processing methods, alloying Al with elements like Ga, Zn, and Sn helps mitigate corrosion and hydrogen evolution. Zinc, in particular, is widely recognized as a beneficial alloying element in Al-air battery anodes because it helps reduce the self-corrosion rate and increases the nominal cell voltage. However, study done by Park, Choi, and Kim highlights a drawback: the addition of Zn can actually decrease the discharge performance of the anode in alkaline solutions due to passivation effects during anodic polarization. Specifically, Zn promotes the formation of two types of oxidation films. The first, Type 1 film, is a porous layer composed of Zn(OH)_{2} and defective ZnO, which forms when dissolved Zn(OH)_{4}^{2-} precipitates from the bulk electrolyte. The second, Type 2 film, is a compact, protective layer of ZnO that forms directly from the oxidation of the metal surface and is more stable. This Type 2 film creates a passivation layer that impairs the discharge performance of the Al-air battery. However, the addition of indium (In) helps break down and destabilize this Zn passive layer. The In ions repeatedly create defects within the Type 2 film through a cycle of breakdown and re-passivation, effectively weakening the protective barrier and enhancing the battery's discharge efficiency. As a result, using an Al-Zn-In ternary alloy anode, produced from commercially available aluminium rather than expensive high-purity aluminium, presents a cost-effective solution with improved performance.

Copper-deposited Al alloys have also shown promise as an anode material, forming protective layers that decrease hydrogen evolution and enhance discharge performance. A study done by Mutlu and Yazıcı shows that copper electrodeposition helps lower the charge-transfer resistance of aluminium anodes. This is because certain compounds (like Al(OH)_{2}^{+}, Al_{7}(OH)_{17}^{4+}, Al_{2}(OH)_{2}^{4+}, and Al_{13}(OH)_{34}^{5+}) build up on the surface and create resistance. In contrast, Al(OH)_{3} dissolves in alkaline solutions, forming Al(OH)_{4}^{-}, which has a lower dissolution rate and maintains a balance between Al(OH) and Al(OH)_{4}^{-}. Copper helps remove these compounds from the surface, reducing resistance and improving discharge performance. Additionally, the resistance of aluminium oxide is higher than that of the copper-aluminium combination, so copper reduces the film's resistance and makes it more durable. Overall, advancements in alloy composition and fabrication methods are critical for maximizing the efficiency and cost-effectiveness of Al anodes.

== Commercialization ==
=== Issues ===
Aluminium as a "fuel" for vehicles has been studied by Yang and Knickle. In 2002, they concluded:

The Al/air battery system can generate enough energy and power for driving ranges and acceleration similar to gasoline powered cars ... the cost of aluminium as an anode can be as low as US$1.1/kg as long as the reaction product is recycled. The total fuel efficiency during the cycle process in Al/air electric vehicles (EVs) can be 15% (present stage) or 20% (projected), comparable to that of internal combustion engine vehicles (ICEs) (13%). The design battery energy density is 1,300 Wh/kg (present) or 2,000 Wh/kg (projected). The cost of battery system chosen to evaluate is US$30/kW (present) or US$29/kW (projected). Al/air EVs life-cycle analysis was conducted and compared to lead/acid and nickel metal hydride (NiMH) EVs. Only the Al/air EVs can be projected to have a travel range comparable to ICEs. From this analysis, Al/air EVs are the most promising candidates compared to ICEs in terms of travel range, purchase price, fuel cost, and life-cycle cost.

Technical problems remain to be solved to make Al–air batteries suitable for electric vehicles. Anodes made of pure aluminium are corroded by the electrolyte, so the aluminium is usually alloyed with tin or other elements. The hydrated alumina that is created by the cell reaction forms a gel-like substance at the anode and reduces the electricity output. This is an issue being addressed in the development work on Al–air cells. For example, additives that form the alumina as a powder rather than a gel have been developed.

Modern air cathodes consist of a reactive layer of carbon with a nickel-grid current collector, a catalyst (e.g., cobalt), and a porous hydrophobic polytetrafluoroethylene film that prevents electrolyte leakage. The oxygen in the air passes through the polytetrafluoroethylene then reacts with the water to create hydroxide ions. These cathodes work well, but they can be expensive.

Traditional Al–air batteries had a limited shelf life, because the aluminium reacted with the electrolyte and produced hydrogen when the battery was not in use; this is no longer the case with modern designs. The problem can be avoided by storing the electrolyte in a tank outside the battery and transferring it to the battery when it is required for use.

These batteries can be used as reserve batteries in telephone exchanges and as backup power sources.

Another problem is the cost of materials that need to be added to the battery to avoid power dropping. Aluminium is still very cheap compared to other elements used to build batteries. Aluminium costs $2.51 per kilogram while lithium and nickel cost $12.59 and $17.12 per kilogram, respectively. However, one other element typically used in aluminium air as a catalyst in the cathode is silver, which costs about $922 per kilogram (2024 prices).

Aluminium–air batteries may become an effective solution for marine applications due to their high energy density, low cost, and the abundance of aluminium, with no emissions at the point of use in boats and ships. AlumaPower, Phinergy Marine, Log 9 Materials, RiAlAiR and several other commercial companies are working on commercial and military applications in the marine environment.

Research and development is taking place on alternative, safer, and higher performance electrolytes such as organic solvents and ionic liquids. Others such as AlumaPower are focusing on mechanical methods to mitigate many of the historical issues with Al-air batteries. AlumaPower's patent (US US10978758B2) illustrates a method that rotates the anode which eliminates wear patterns and corrosion of the anode. The patent further claims that the design can use any scrap aluminium, including remelted soda cans and engine blocks.

== See also ==
- List of battery types
- Zinc–air battery
- Potassium-ion battery
- Metal–air electrochemical cell
- Aluminium-ion battery
- Aluminium battery
