= Silicon–air battery =

Type of metal–air battery

Silicon–air batteries are a new battery technology invented by a team led by Yair Ein-Eli at the Grand Technion Energy Program at the Technion – Israel Institute of Technology.

Silicon–air battery technology is based on electrodes of oxygen and silicon. Such batteries can be lightweight, with a high tolerance for both extremely dry conditions and high humidity. Like other anode–air batteries, in particular metal–air batteries, silicon–air batteries rely on atmospheric oxygen for their cathodes; they accordingly do not include any cathode materials in their structures, and this permits economies in cost and weight.

Experimental cells using a room-temperature ionic liquid electrolytes have produced between 1 and 1.2 volts at a current density of 0.3 milliamperes per square centimeter of silicon.

== History ==
The only research report available to the public was done by its creator, Yair-Ein-Eli. Eli began research in Technion – Israel Institute of Technology with David Starosvetsky, graduate student Gil Cohen of Technion, Digby Macdonald of Pennsylvania State University, and Rika Hagiwara of Kyoto University. Eli's reasoning for using silicon as a fuel cell is because of its high specific energy, its large availability as a resource (silicon being the eighth most plentiful in the universe, the second most plentiful in Earth's crust), tolerance of places with high humidity, and non-toxic properties. In their experiments, they tested for different potential energies and voltages, using different liquid oxygen solutions. The experimental results and theories on the battery were published online in 2009 in the journal Electrochemistry Communications. This got the attention of organizations such as DARPA and the Pentagon, where they are currently working on military usage of this battery. The battery is still under research by these organizations and not available for commercial use.

== Design ==
The battery's energy source is made using an ionic liquid known as 1-ethyl-3-methylimidazolium oligofluorohydrogenate (EMI·2.3HF·F), classified in the article as a room temperature ionic liquid (RTIL), and wafers containing high amounts of silicon. The wafers act as an anode (oxidation of the fuel source) and the RTIL acts as an electrolyte which turns the wafers into usable energy. In its idle state, the RTIL dissolves the wafers at a slow rate because there is no semi-conductor to speed up the reaction. When put into use, the RTIL will then react faster to dissolve the silicon wafers, which will produce energy for use in any electronics. The battery lacks a built-in cathode that most batteries use to balance the anode's charge. Instead, the membrane of the battery allows oxygen from the atmosphere to flow through it and acts as the cathode.

=== SPECTRE ===
The Stressed Pillar-Engineered CMOS Technology Readied for Evanescence (SPECTRE) is under research by DARPA and SRI. It is based on a silicon–air batteries with an added feature: in equipment where the enemy is to be denied the ability to profit from captured devices or from information to be gained from such devices, a SPECTRE battery can respond to a kill signal by self-destructing along with the device it powers. This is of potential interest in military applications.

== Storage capacity ==
The storage capacity of the battery is very comparable to that of aluminum–air battery. The specific energy of the silicon–air battery is estimated to be 8470 Wh/kg and the energy density is about 2109.0 Wh/L. The battery voltage is 1–1.2 V. By the use of a dedicated electrolyte flow system, discharge times of more than 1000 hours can be achieved for aqueous electrolytes, which allows for 100% usage of the silicon anode.

== Applications ==
One particularly promising field of application for silicon–air batteries is powering small-scale medical devices such as diabetic pumps and hearing aids, in which tedious charging would be a disadvantage.

The nature of the silicon–air battery also renders it particularly suitable for humid climates such as in tropical regions of Asia, America or Africa.

Research is under way to develop silicon–air batteries for everyday applications. Examples include power for consumer electronics such as laptops and phones.

Efforts to develop deployable and scalable systems based on the silicon–air technology are underway.

== See also ==
- List of battery types
