= Lithium-ion flow battery =

Type of electrochemical cell

A lithium-ion flow battery is a flow battery that uses a form of lightweight lithium as its charge carrier. The flow battery stores energy separately from its system for discharging. The amount of energy it can store is determined by tank size; its power density is determined by the size of the reaction chamber.

Dissolving a material changes its chemical behavior significantly. Some flow batteries suspend grains of solid material in a liquid, which preserves its characteristics, making lithium's high energy density available to flow systems.

== Lithium polysulfide ==
One device uses dissolved sulfur as the cathode, lithium metal as the anode and an organic solvent as the electrolyte. Officially "membraneless", it uses a coating to separate anode from cathode. It uses a single tank and pump and reacts the LiS with lithium to produce power. The device operated for more than 2000 cycles without substantial degradation.

When discharging, the lithium polysulfide absorbs lithium ions; releasing them when charging. The demonstration device yielded energy density of 97 Wh/kg and 108 Wh/L with a 5M Li_{2}S_{8} catholyte.

== LiFePO_{4} ==
Reversible delithiation/lithiation of LiFePO_{4} was successfully demonstrated using ferrocene derivatives. This device keeps the energy storage materials stored in separate tanks. The liquids remain stationary during operation. The device incorporated a lithium-ion permeable membrane.

== Lithium iodine ==
A cathode-flow lithium-iodine (Li–I) battery uses the triiodide/iodide (I_{3}^{−}/I^{−}) redox couple in aqueous solution. It has energy density of 0.33 kWh/kg because of the solubility of LiI in aqueous solution (≈8.2M) and its power density of 130 mW/cm^{2} at a current rate of 60 mA/cm^{2}, 328 K. In operation, the battery attains 90% of the theoretical storage capacity, coulombic efficiency of 100%±1% in 2–20 cycles, and cyclic performance of >99% capacity retention for 20 cycles, up to total capacity of 100 mAh.

== LiTi_{2}(PO_{4})_{3}–LiFePO_{4} ==
A semi-solid cell based on the LiTi_{2}(PO_{4})_{3}–LiFePO_{4} couple utilizes fluid electrodes that are electronically conductive. Simultaneous advection and electrochemical transport separates flow-induced losses from those due to underlying side reactions. Plug flow is used to achieve energy efficiency with non-Newtonian flow electrodes.
