= Zinc–air battery =

High-energy-density electrical storage device

- Specific energy: 470 (practical),1370 (theoretical) Wh/kg (1.692, 4.932 MJ/kg)
- Energy density: 1480–9780 Wh/L (5.328–35.21 MJ/L)
- Specific power: 100 W/kg
- Nominal cell voltage: 1.45 V

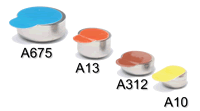
Zinc–air hearing aid batteries

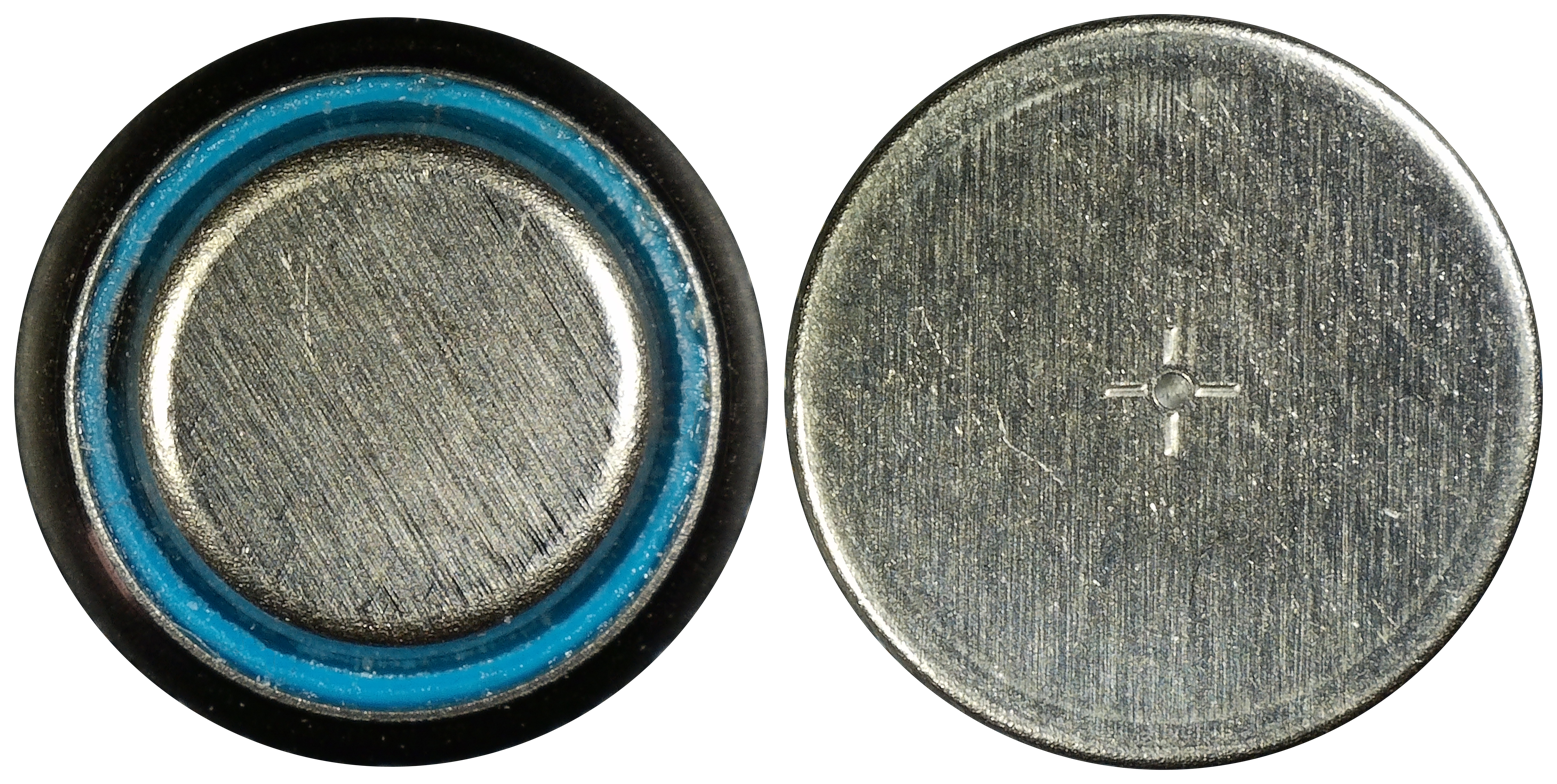
PR70 from both sides. Left side: Anode and gasket. Right side: Cathode and inlet opening for the atmospheric oxygen

A zinc–air battery is a metal–air electrochemical cell powered by the oxidation of zinc with oxygen in air. During discharge, a mass of zinc particles forms a porous anode, which is saturated with an electrolyte. Oxygen from the air reacts at the cathode and forms hydroxyl ions which migrate into the zinc paste and form zincate (Zn(OH)^{2−}_{4}), releasing electrons to travel to the cathode. The zincate decays into zinc oxide and water returns to the electrolyte. The water and hydroxyl from the anode are recycled at the cathode, so the water is not consumed. The reactions produce a theoretical voltage of 1.65 volts, but is reduced to 1.35–1.4 V in available cells.

These batteries have high energy densities and are relatively inexpensive to produce. Zinc–air batteries possess some properties of fuel cells as well as batteries: the zinc is the fuel, the reaction rate can be controlled by varying the air flow, and oxidized zinc/electrolyte paste can be replaced with fresh paste.

Sizes range from very small button cells for hearing aids, larger batteries used in film cameras that previously used mercury batteries, to very large batteries used for electric vehicle propulsion and grid-scale energy storage. Zinc-air batteries can be used to replace now discontinued 1.35 V mercury batteries (albeit with a significantly shorter operating life), which in the 1970s through 1980s were commonly used in photo cameras and hearing aids. Possible future applications of this battery include its deployment as an electric vehicle battery and as a utility-scale energy storage system.

== History ==
The effect of oxygen was known early in the 19th century when wet-cell Leclanche batteries absorbed atmospheric oxygen into the carbon cathode current collector. In 1878, a porous platinized carbon air electrode was found to work as well as the manganese dioxide (MnO_{2}) of the Leclanche cell. Commercial products on this principle began in 1932 with George W. Heise and Erwin A. Schumacher of the National Carbon Company, who built the first cells, treating the carbon electrodes with wax to prevent flooding. This type of cell is still used for large zinc–air cells for navigation aids and rail transportation. However, the current capacity is low and the cells are bulky.

Large primary zinc–air cells such as the Thomas A. Edison Industries Carbonaire type were used for railway signaling, remote communication sites, and navigation buoys. These were long-duration, low-rate applications. Development of thin electrodes based on fuel-cell research in the 1970s allowed application to small button and prismatic primary cells for hearing aids, pagers, and medical devices, especially cardiac telemetry.

== Reaction equations ==
Animation of the operation of a zinc–air cell

The chemical equations for the zinc–air cell are:

Anode:

Zn + 4 OH^{−} → Zn(OH)^{2−}_{4} + 2 e^{−} (E_{0} = −1.25 V)

Fluid:

Zn(OH)^{2−}_{4} → ZnO + H_{2}O + 2 OH^{−}

Cathode:

1/2 O_{2} + H_{2}O + 2 e^{−} → 2 OH^{−} (E_{0} = 0.34 V, pH = 11)

Overall

2 Zn + O_{2} → 2 ZnO (E_{0} = 1.59 V)

Zinc–air batteries cannot be used in a sealed battery holder since some air must come in; the oxygen in 1 liter of air is required for every ampere-hour of capacity used.

== Storage density ==
Zinc–air batteries have a higher energy density than many other types of batteries because atmospheric air is one of the battery reactants, in contrast to battery types that require materials like manganese dioxide in combination with zinc. Energy density, when measured by weight (mass) is known as specific energy. The following table shows the calculation of specific energy for a specific zinc-air battery and several other commonly available batteries of different chemistries.

Battery chemistry	Description	Capacity (mAh)	Voltage	Weight (g)	Specific energy (mWh/g)
Zinc-air	Prismatic shape, similar in volume to a AAA battery	3600	1.3	11.7	400
Zinc manganese dioxide "alkaline"	Typical AA Cell	3000	1.5	23	195.7
Silver oxide	Button Cell 357/303	150	1.55	2.3	101
Lithium-ion	Lithium Nickel Cobalt 18650.	3200	3.6	38.5	243

== Storage and operating life ==
Zinc–air cells have a long shelf life if sealed to keep air out. Even miniature button cells can be stored for up to 3 years at room temperature with little capacity loss if their seals are not removed. Industrial cells stored in a dry state have an indefinite storage life.

The operating life of a zinc–air cell is a critical function of its interaction with the environment. The electrolyte loses water more rapidly in conditions of high temperature and low humidity. Because the potassium hydroxide electrolyte is deliquescent, in very humid conditions, excess water accumulates in the cell, flooding the cathode and destroying its active properties. Potassium hydroxide also reacts with atmospheric carbon dioxide, and resulting carbonate formation eventually reduces electrolyte conductivity. Miniature cells have high self-discharge once opened to air, thus the cell's capacity is intended to be used within a few weeks.

== Discharge properties ==
Because the cathode does not change properties during discharge, terminal voltage is quite stable until the cell approaches exhaustion.

Power capacity is a function of several variables: cathode area, air availability, porosity, and the catalytic value of the cathode surface. Oxygen entry into the cell must be balanced against electrolyte water loss; cathode membranes are coated with (hydrophobic) Teflon material to limit water loss. Low humidity increases water loss; if enough water is lost, the cell fails. Button cells have a limited current drain; for example an IEC PR44 cell has a capacity of 600 milliamp-hours (mAh) but a maximum current of only 22 milliamps (mA). Pulse load currents can be much higher since some oxygen remains in the cell between pulses.

Low temperature reduces primary cell capacity but the effect is small for low drains. A cell may deliver 80% of its capacity if discharged over 300 hours at 0 °C (32 °F), but only 20% of capacity if discharged at a 50-hour rate at that temperature. Lower temperature also reduces cell voltage.

== Cell types ==
=== Primary (non-rechargeable) ===
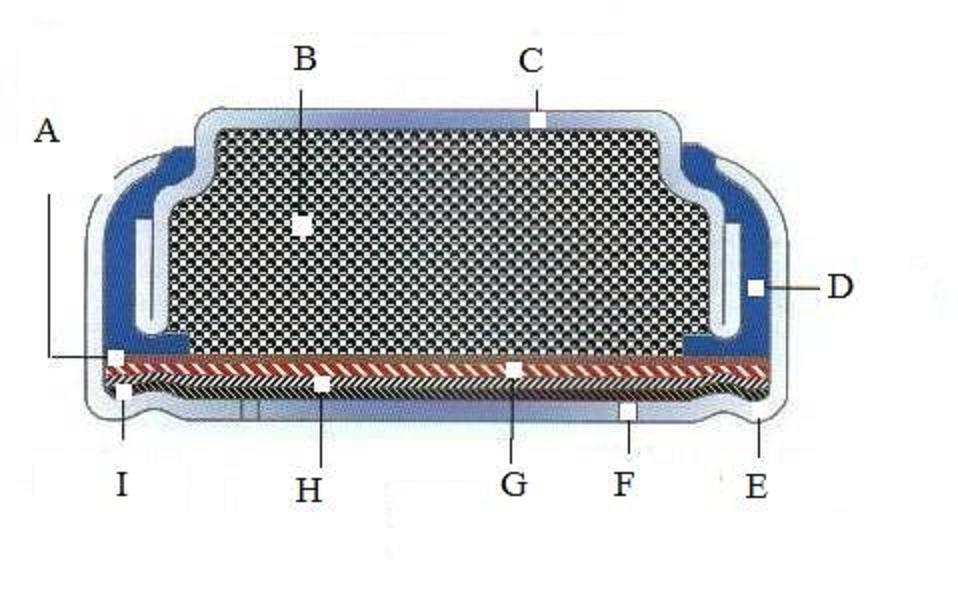
Cross section through a zinc–air button cell. A:Separator, B: zinc powder anode and electrolyte, C: anode can, D: insulator gasket, E: cathode can, F: air hole, G: cathode catalyst and current collector, H:air distribution layer, I: Semi permeable membrane

Large zinc–air batteries, with capacities up to 2,000 ampere–hours per cell, are used to power navigation instruments and marker lights, oceanographic experiments and railway signals.

Primary cells are made in button format to about 1 Ah. They were also manufactured in a rectangular housing, compatible with 9V applications, albeit offering only an 8.4V output. These were sold under the brand name "Tronox" and used for medical applications. Prismatic shapes for portable devices are manufactured with capacities between 5 and 30 Ah. Hybrid cell cathodes include manganese dioxide to allow high peak currents.

Button cells are highly effective, but it is difficult to extend the same construction to larger sizes due to air diffusion performance, heat dissipation, and leakage problems. Prismatic and cylindrical cell designs address these problems. Stacking prismatic cells requires air channels in the battery and may require a fan to force air through the stack.

=== Secondary (rechargeable) ===
Rechargeable zinc–air cells require zinc precipitation from the water-based electrolyte to be closely controlled. Challenges include dendrite formation, non-uniform zinc dissolution, and limited solubility in electrolytes. Electrically reversing the reaction at a bi-functional air cathode, to liberate oxygen from discharge reaction products, is difficult; membranes tested to date have low overall efficiency. Charging voltage is much higher than discharge voltage, producing cycle energy efficiency as low as 50%. Providing charge and discharge functions by separate uni-functional cathodes increases cell size, weight and complexity. A satisfactory electrically recharged system potentially offers low material cost and high specific energy. As of 2014, only one company has commercial units for sale, as described in a Dept. of Energy produced video at the ARPA-e Energy Innovation Summit in 2013. Fluidic Energy has apparently covered hundreds of thousands of outages in Asia at distributed critical load sites. EOS Energy Storage has deployed a 1MWh system for a microgrid at a New Jersey wastewater treatment plant and has previously tested grid-scale backup applications. AZA Battery has announced development of pilot production of prismatic zinc air cells with characteristics suitable for both stationary storage and mobility applications.

=== Mechanical recharge ===
Rechargeable systems may mechanically replace the anode and electrolyte, essentially operating as a refurbishable primary cell, or may use zinc powder or other methods to replenish the reactants. Mechanically recharged systems were investigated for military electronics uses in the 1960s because of the high energy density and easy recharging. However, primary lithium batteries offered higher discharge rates and easier handling.

Mechanical recharging systems have been researched for decades for use in electric vehicles. Some approaches use a large zinc–air battery to maintain charge on a high discharge–rate battery used for peak loads during acceleration. Zinc granules serve as the reactant. Vehicles recharge via exchanging used electrolyte and depleted zinc for fresh reactants at a service station.

The term zinc–air fuel cell usually refers to a zinc–air battery in which zinc metal is added and zinc oxide is removed continuously. Zinc electrolyte paste or pellets are pushed into a chamber, and waste zinc oxide is pumped into a waste tank or bladder inside the fuel tank. Fresh zinc paste or pellets are taken from the fuel tank. The zinc oxide waste is pumped out at a refueling station for recycling. Alternatively, this term may refer to an electrochemical system in which zinc is a co-reactant assisting the reformation of hydrocarbons at the anode of a fuel cell.

The benefits of mechanical recharging systems over rechargeable batteries include the decoupling of energy and power components, providing design flexibility for different charge rate, discharge rate, and energy capacity requirements.

== Materials ==
=== Catalysts ===
Cobalt oxide/carbon nanotube hybrid oxygen reduction catalyst and nickel-iron layered double hydroxide oxygen evolution cathode catalysts exhibited higher catalytic activity and durability in concentrated alkaline electrolytes than precious metal platinum and iridium catalysts. The resulting primary zinc–air battery showed peak power density of ~265 mW/cm^{3}, current density of ~200 mA/cm^{3} at 1 V and energy density >700 Wh/kg.

Rechargeable Zn–air batteries in a tri-electrode configuration exhibited an unprecedented small charge–discharge voltage polarization of ~0.70 V at 20 mA/cm^{3}, high reversibility and stability over long charge and discharge cycles.

In 2015, researchers announced a carbon-based, metal-free electrocatalyst that works efficiently in both reduction and oxygenation reactions. Organic compound aniline, polymerized into long chains in a phytic acid solution, was freeze-dried into a stable, mesoporous carbon aerogel with 2–50 nm pores, providing high surface area and room for the battery electrolyte to diffuse. The researchers pyrolized the aerogel to 1,000 degrees Celsius, turning the foam into a graphitic network, with many catalytic graphene edges. The aniline doped the foam with nitrogen, which enhances reduction. Phytic acid infuses the foam with phosphorus, helping oxygen evolution. The foam has a surface area of ~1,663 m^{2}/gr. Primary batteries demonstrated an open-circuit potential of 1.48 V, a specific capacity of 735 mAh/gr (Zn) (energy density of 835 Wh/kg (Zn)), a peak power density of 55 mW/cm^{3} and stable operation for 240 h after mechanical recharging. Two-electrode rechargeable batteries cycled stably for 180 cycles at 2 mA/cm^{3}.

== Applications ==
=== Vehicle propulsion ===
Metallic zinc could be used as an alternative fuel for vehicles, either in a zinc–air battery or to generate hydrogen near the point of use. Zinc's characteristics have motivated considerable interest as an energy source for electric vehicles. Gulf General Atomic demonstrated a 20 kW vehicle battery. General Motors conducted tests in the 1970s. Neither project led to a commercial product.

In addition to liquid, pellets could be formed that are small enough to pump. Fuel cells using pellets would be able to quickly replace zinc-oxide with fresh zinc metal. The spent material can be recycled. The zinc–air cell is a primary cell (non-rechargeable); recycling is required to reclaim the zinc, and consideration should be given to the energy required to reclaim the zinc in larger industrial-scale situations.

An advantage of utilizing zinc–air batteries for vehicle propulsion is the mineral's relative abundance when compared to lithium. As of 2020, the total global zinc reserves are estimated to be around 1.9 billion tons, whereas total lithium reserves are estimated as 86 million tons.

=== Grid storage ===
The Eos Energy System battery is about half the size of a shipping container and provides 1 MWh of storage. Con Edison, National Grid, Enel and GDF SUEZ began testing the battery for grid storage. Con Edison and City University of New York are testing a zinc-based battery from Urban Electric Power as part of a New York State Energy Research and Development Authority program. Eos projects that the cost of storing electricity with such Eos batteries is US$160/kWh and that it will provide electricity cheaper than a new natural-gas peaking power station. Other battery technologies range from $400 to about $1,000 a kilowatt-hour.

=== Pressure generation ===
When a load is applied over zinc-air batteries without access to oxygen, they generate hydrogen gas at a fairly controllable rate, proportional to the load. This can build up pressure, which is used in certain applications to expel another liquid over a longer period, like automatic lubricators or air fresheners.

== Alternative configurations ==
Attempts to address zinc–air's limitations include:

- Pumping zinc slurry through the battery in one direction for charging and reversing for discharge. Capacity is limited only by the slurry reservoir size.
- Alternate electrode shapes (via gelling and binding agents)
- Humidity management
- Careful catalyst dispersal to improve oxygen reduction and production
- Modularizing components for repair without complete replacement

== Safety and environment ==
Zinc corrosion can produce potentially explosive hydrogen. Vent holes prevent pressure build-up within the cell. Manufacturers caution against hydrogen build-up in enclosed areas. A short-circuited cell gives relatively low current. Deep discharge below 0.5 V/cell may result in electrolyte leakage; little useful capacity exists below 0.9 V/cell.

Older designs used mercury amalgam amounting to about 1% of the weight of a button cell, to prevent zinc corrosion. Newer types have no added mercury. Zinc itself is relatively low in toxicity. Mercury-free designs require no special handling when discarded or recycled.

In United States waters, environmental regulations now require proper disposal of primary batteries removed from navigation aids. Formerly, discarded zinc–air primary batteries were dropped into the water around buoys, which allowed mercury to escape into the environment.

== See also ==
- List of battery types
- List of battery sizes
- Comparison of battery types
- Aluminium–air battery
- Fluidic Energy
- Fuel cell
- Gas diffusion electrode
- Hydrogen technologies
- Metal–air electrochemical cell
- Zinc-bromide battery
