= 1-Ethyl-3-methylimidazolium chloride =

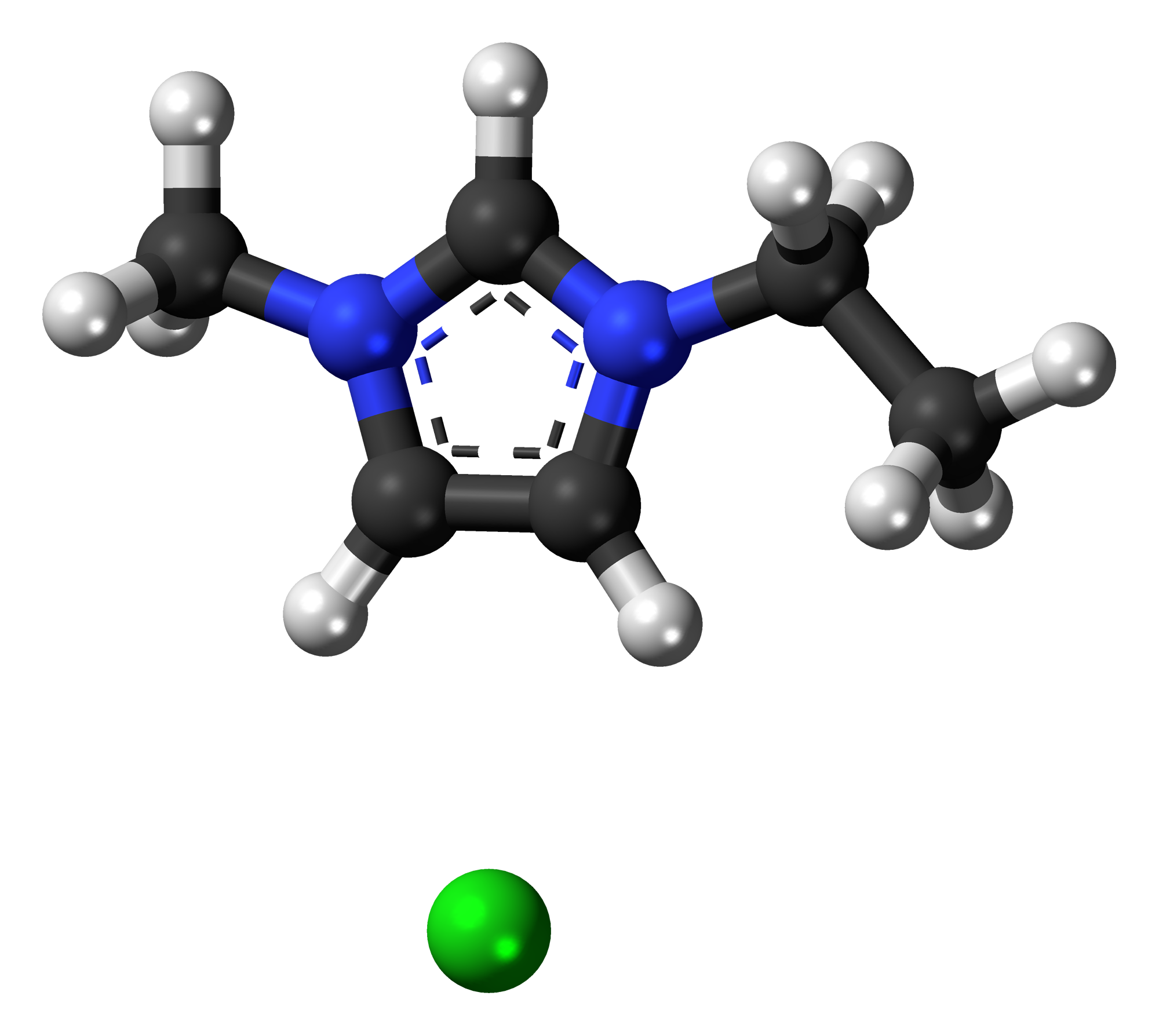

Names
- Preferred IUPAC name 1-Ethyl-3-methyl-1H-imidazol-3-ium chloride
- Other names [EMIM]Cl

Identifiers
CAS Number	65039-09-0
3D model (JSmol)	Interactive image; Interactive image
ChEBI	CHEBI:61327
ChemSpider	2015916
ECHA InfoCard	100.129.917
EC Number	613-739-4
PubChem CID	2734160
UNII	PH90AQ1E93
CompTox Dashboard (EPA)	DTXSID1041180
- InChI: InChI=1S/C6H11N2.ClH/c1-3-8-5-4-7(2)6-8;/h4-6H,3H2,1-2H3;1H/q+1;/p-1 Key: BMQZYMYBQZGEEY-UHFFFAOYSA-M
- SMILES: CCN1C=C[N+](C)=C1.[Cl-]; CCn1cc[n+](c1)C.[Cl-]

Properties
Chemical formula	C_{6}H_{11}ClN_{2}
Molar mass	146.62 g·mol^{−1}
Melting point	77 to 79 °C (171 to 174 °F; 350 to 352 K)

Hazards
- GHS labelling
Pictograms	(GHS07: Exclamation mark)
Signal word	Warning
Hazard statements	H302, H315, H319
Precautionary statements	P264, P270, P280, P301+P312, P302+P352, P305+P351+P338, P321, P330, P332+P313, P337+P313, P362, P501
- Except where otherwise noted, data are given for materials in their standard state (at 25 °C [77 °F], 100 kPa). verify (what is ?) Infobox references

1-Ethyl-3-methylimidazolium chloride or [EMIM]Cl is an ionic liquid that can be used in cellulose processing. The cation consists of a five-membered ring with two nitrogen and three carbon atoms, i.e. a derivative of imidazole, with ethyl and methyl groups substituted at the two nitrogen atoms. Its melting point is 77–79 °C.
