= Nanopore battery =

Rechargeable composite nanoscale battery

A nanopore battery is a rechargeable battery that is a composite of billions of nanoscale batteries formed within the pores of a substrate.

The space inside the holes is so small that billions of pores combined equal the volume of a grain of sand. Each pore's diameter was some one eighty-thousandth the width of a human hair.

== Construction ==
In 2014 a demonstration device was made from a ceramic sheet made of anodic aluminum. It held two vanadium pentoxide nanotube electrodes separated by an electrolyte that carried the electrical charge between the two. The current collector was made of ruthenium. The individual batteries are connected in parallel.

The V_{2}O_{5} is prelithiated at one end to form the anode, with pure V_{2}O_{5} at the other end to form the cathode. The battery asymmetrically cycles between 0.2 V and 1.8 V.

== Performance ==
The capacity retention of this full cell (relative to 1 C values) is 95% at 5 C and 46% at 150 C, with a 1,000-cycle life. A demonstration device was fully charged in 12 minutes and recharged thousands of times.

== Implications ==
The system uses an electrochemical regime in which ion insertion and surface charge mechanisms for energy storage become indistinguishable. It can serve as a vehicle for studying ion transport limits in dense, nanostructured, electrode arrays.

== See also ==
- List of battery types
