= Metal–air electrochemical cell =

Electrochemical cell using a metallic anode and oxygen cathode

metal-air battery
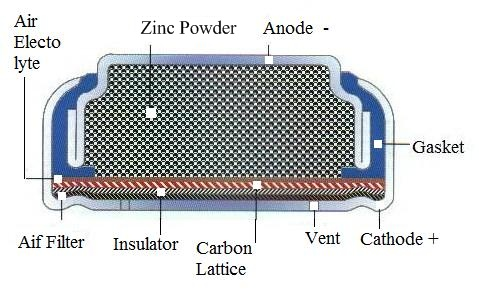
- Internal component parts of a Zinc Air Button Cell now labelled with its component parts identified.

A metal-air electrochemical cell, or metal-air battery, uses a pure-metal anode and an external air cathode, typically with an aqueous or aprotic electrolyte. The metal oxidizes at the anode while oxygen from the air is reduced at the cathode. Because the oxygen is taken from the air rather than stored in the cell, metal-air batteries have a much higher theoretical specific energy than lithium-ion batteries, approaching that of gasoline.

The technology has seen commercial success in specific applications, most notably zinc–air batteries, which are widely used in hearing aids and railway signaling due to their high energy density and safety. Other chemistries, such as lithium–air, aluminium–air, and iron–air, are the subject of intense research for grid-scale storage and electric vehicle applications.

Despite their high potential, the development of rechargeable (secondary) metal–air cells has been hindered by significant technical challenges.

These include the sluggish kinetics of the oxygen reduction reaction (ORR) during discharge and the oxygen evolution reaction (OER) during charge, which necessitate efficient electrocatalysts. Additionally, metal anodes suffer from corrosion, passivation, and dendritic growth during cycling, while the open cell architecture exposes the electrolyte to evaporation and contamination from atmospheric carbon dioxide.

== Types by anode element ==
=== Lithium ===
The remarkably high energy density of lithium metal (up to 3458 Wh/kg) inspired the design of lithium–air batteries. A lithium–air battery consists of a solid lithium electrode, an electrolyte surrounding this electrode, and an ambient air electrode containing oxygen. Current lithium–air batteries can be divided into four subcategories based on the electrolyte used and the subsequent electrochemical cell architecture. These electrolyte categories are aprotic, aqueous, mixed aqueous/aprotic, and solid state, all of which offer their own distinct advantages and disadvantages. Nonetheless, efficiency of lithium–air batteries is still limited by incomplete discharge at the cathode, charging overpotential exceeding discharge overpotential, and component stability. During discharge of lithium–air batteries, the superoxide ion (O_{2}^{−}) formed will react with the electrolyte or other cell components and will prevent the battery from being rechargeable.

=== Sodium ===
Sodium–air batteries were proposed with the hopes of overcoming the battery instability associated with superoxide in lithium–air batteries. Sodium, with an energy density of 1605 Wh/kg, does not boast as high an energy density as lithium. However, it can form a stable superoxide (NaO_{2}) as opposed to the superoxide undergoing detrimental secondary reactions. Since NaO_{2} will decompose reversibly to an extent back to the elemental components, this means sodium–air batteries have some intrinsic capacity to be rechargeable. Sodium–air batteries can only function with aprotic, anhydrous electrolytes. When a DMSO electrolyte was stabilized with sodium trifluoromethanesulfonimide, the highest cycling stability of a sodium–air battery was obtained (150 cycles).

=== Potassium ===
Potassium–air batteries utilize the reaction between potassium and oxygen to form potassium superoxide (KO_{2}) upon discharge. The cell reaction can be described as:

$$\ce{K + O2 -> KO2}$$

Unlike lithium peroxide (Li_{2}O_{2}), the formation and decomposition of KO_{2} is thermodynamically stable and kinetically fast, allowing potassium–air batteries to achieve an exceptionally low overpotential of approximately 50 mV. This results in a round-trip energy efficiency of >90%, the highest among metal–air chemistries.

Because of this high efficiency and the abundance of potassium, the technology is primarily researched as a low-cost candidate for grid energy storage. While the theoretical specific energy (935 Wh/kg) is lower than lithium–air, it is still sufficient for potential electric vehicle applications. Innovative research has also explored "solar-assisted" potassium–air batteries, where a solar cell is integrated into the cell structure to assist the photo-electrochemical charging process, further reducing the energy input required from the grid.

However, a major barrier to commercialization is the high reactivity of metallic potassium with moisture. Commercial implementation would likely require complex oxygen-purification membranes to prevent the anode from reacting with humidity in the ambient air.

=== Zinc ===
Zinc–air batteries are the most mature metal–air technology, finding widespread commercial use in hearing aids and railway navigation signals due to their cost-effectiveness and safety. They offer a high theoretical specific energy of 1350 Wh/kg (excluding oxygen).

While primary (non-rechargeable) zinc–air cells are commercially successful, developing electrically rechargeable (secondary) units remains a significant technical challenge. The main hurdles include the non-uniform deposition of zinc during charging, leading to the formation of dendrites that can short-circuit the cell. Additionally, the alkaline electrolyte is highly sensitive to atmospheric carbon dioxide. The CO_{2} reacts with hydroxide ions in the electrolyte to form carbonate precipitates (K_{2}CO_{3} or Na_{2}CO_{3}), which clog the porous air electrode and reduce ionic conductivity.

=== Magnesium ===
Magnesium–air batteries are attractive due to the high abundance of magnesium and its operational safety, as it is less prone to dangerous dendrite formation than lithium. However, the technology is severely limited by the "parasitic corrosion" or self-discharge of the magnesium anode in aqueous electrolytes. During operation, the magnesium spontaneously reacts with water to generate hydrogen gas and form a passivating layer of magnesium hydroxide (Mg(OH)_{2}):

$$\ce{Mg + 2 H2O -> Mg(OH)2 + H2}$$

This passivation layer on the anode surface blocks the electrode and effectively halts the electrochemical reaction. Current research focuses on using corrosion inhibitors, alloyed anodes, or developing non-aqueous electrolytes to mitigate these issues.

=== Calcium ===
Calcium–air batteries utilize the reaction of calcium with oxygen, theoretically offering a high specific energy of 2990 Wh/kg and a high open-circuit voltage of 3.12 V. The discharge reaction typically forms calcium oxide (CaO):

$$\ce{2 Ca + O2 -> 2 CaO}$$

Despite this potential, the technology faces severe challenges regarding electrolyte compatibility. In aqueous electrolytes, calcium reacts violently with water to form calcium hydroxide (Ca(OH)_{2}) and hydrogen gas, resulting in rapid self-discharge. In aprotic (non-aqueous) electrolytes, the electrochemical activity is typically hindered by the formation of an insulating passivation layer on the anode surface, which prevents reversible calcium plating and stripping. Research is currently limited compared to lithium or zinc systems, with efforts focused on finding suitable electrolytes that support reversible electrochemistry at room temperature.

=== Aluminium ===
Aluminium–air batteries have the highest energy density of any other battery, with a theoretical maximum energy density of 6–8 kWh/kg, however, as of 2003, a maximum of only 1.3 kWh/kg has been achieved. Aluminium battery cells are not rechargeable, so new aluminium anodes must be installed to continue getting power from the battery, which makes them expensive to use and limited to mostly military applications.

Aluminium–air batteries have been used for prototypes of electric cars, with one claiming 2000 km of range on a single charge, however none have been available to the public. However, aluminium–air batteries maintain a stable voltage and power output until they run out of power, which could make them useful for electric planes, where full power is always required in case of emergency landings. Due to not having to carry a separate metal anode, the natural low density of aluminium, and the high energy density of aluminium–air batteries, the batteries are very lightweight, which is also beneficial for electric aviation. The scale of airports could also allow for on-site recycling of anodes, which would not be feasible for cars where many small stations are necessary.

Aluminium–air batteries are better for the environment compared to traditional lithium-ion batteries. Aluminium is the most abundant metal in the Earth's crust, so mines would not have to be as invasive to find a similar amount of aluminium compared to lithium. Another factor is that aluminium recycling plants already exist, while lithium recycling plants are just starting to emerge and become profitable. Aluminium is a lot more economical to recycle with current technology.

=== Iron ===
Iron–air rechargeable batteries are an attractive technology with the potential of grid-scale energy storage. The main raw-material of this technology is iron oxide (rust), a material that is abundant, non-toxic, inexpensive, and environmentally friendly. Most of the batteries currently being developed utilize iron oxide powders to generate and store hydrogen via the Fe/FeO reduction/oxidation (redox) reaction (Fe + H_{2}O ⇌ FeO + H_{2}). In conjunction with a fuel cell, this enables the system to behave as a rechargeable battery, creating H_{2}O/H_{2} via the production and consumption of electricity. Furthermore, this technology has minimal environmental impact, as it could be used to store energy from intermittent or variable energy sources, such as solar and wind, developing an energy system with low carbon dioxide emissions.

One way the system can start is by using the Fe/FeO redox reaction. Hydrogen created during the oxidation of iron and of oxygen from the air can be consumed by a fuel cell to create electricity. When electricity must be stored, hydrogen generated from water by operating the fuel cell in reverse is consumed during the reduction of the iron oxide to metallic iron. The combination of both of these cycles is what makes the system operate as an iron–air rechargeable battery.

Limitations of this technology come from the materials used, and due to lower energy conversion efficiency. Generally, iron oxide powder beds are selected; however, rapid sintering and pulverization of the powders limits the ability to achieve a high number of cycles, which results in diminished capacity. Other methods currently under investigation, such as 3D printing and freeze-casting, seek to enable the creation of architecture materials to allow for high surface area and volume changes during the redox reaction.

== Comparison ==
| Anode element | Theoretical specific energy, Wh/kg (including oxygen) | Theoretical specific energy, Wh/kg (excluding oxygen) | Calculated open-circuit voltage, V |
|---|---|---|---|
| Aluminium | 4300 | 8140 | 1.2 |
| Germanium | 1480 | 7850 | 1 |
| Calcium | 2990 | 4180 | 3.12 |
| Iron | 1431 | 2044 | 1.3 |
| Lithium | 5210 | 11140 | 2.91 |
| Magnesium | 2789 | 6462 | 2.93 |
| Potassium | 935 | 1700 (Note: Calculated from the specific energy density (including oxygen) value and 39.1 and 16 atomic weight data for K and O respectively for KO_{2}) | 2.48 |
| Sodium | 1677 | 2260 | 2.3 |
| Tin | 860 | 6250 | 0.95 |
| Zinc | 1090 | 1350 | 1.65 |

== See also ==
- Lithium–sulfur battery – Type of rechargeable battery
- Silicon–air battery – Type of metal–air battery
