= List of electric vehicle battery manufacturers =

== List of world's largest EV cell manufacturers in 2023 ==
Battery manufacturer	Production 2023 / EV volumes	Change from 2022	Market share	Headquarters	Year founded	Notes
CATL	260 / 242 GWh	+41%	37%	Ningde, Fujian, China	1999	World's largest battery manufacturer Origins: Amperex Technology Limited
BYD / FinDreams	111 / 115 GWh	+58%	16%	Shenzhen, Guangdong, China	1995	focuses on LFP battery production for battery storage power stations and has introduced a blade battery technology which makes the application reasonable in mid-to long range term electric vehicles
LG Energy Solution	96 / 108 GWh	+34%	14%	Seoul, South Korea	2020	
Panasonic	45 / 57 GWh	+26%	6%	Osaka, Japan	1918	
SK On	34.4 / 40 GWh	+14%	4.9%	Seoul, South Korea	2007	
CALB	33.4 / 23.5 GWh	+81%	4.7%	Changzhou, Jiangsu, China	2007	
Samsung SDI	32.6 / 35.7 GWh	+36%	4.6%	Seoul, South Korea	1970	
Gotion	17.1 GWh	+23.1%	2.4%	Hefei, Anhui, China	1995	
EVE Energy	16.2 GWh	+129.8%	2.3%	Huizhou, Guangdong, China	2001	NMC, LFP, also battery storage power stations
Farasis Energy	16.7 GWh	+123%	2.3%	Ganzhou, Jiangxi, China	2002 / 2009	
Sunwoda	10.5 / 7.0 GWh	+15.4%	1.5%	Shenzhen, Guangdong, China	1997	production in China, India, Vietnam, Hungary, and Morocco
Others	49.4 / 56.0 GWh	+11.3%	7%			

== List of other large EV battery manufacturers ==
Battery manufacturer	Year founded	Headquarters	Production capacity (GWh)	Type of battery	OEM customer	Notes
A123 Systems	2001	Hangzhou, China	1.5 (2018)	Lithium-ion (LFP)	GM; Fisker Automotive (PHEV); Daimler Truck (PHEV); Smith Electric Vehicles; Chery; Kandi; Navistar; Roewe; BMW (PHEV)	Supplies Mercedes-Benz High Performance Engines Formula One racing with parts for kinetic energy recovery system (KERS). Supplies also companies in range-extender business like ALTe Powertrain Technologies, VIA Motors extended-range VTRUX.
AESC	2007	Yokohama, Japan		Lithium-ion	Nissan; BMW; Renault	Joint venture partner Envision (main), Nissan and Tokin Corporation. Former JV partner was NEC.
Akasol	2008	Darmstadt, Germany	2.5 (2022)	Lithium-ion	Yes	Developing and manufacturing batteries for hybrid and electric vehicles, regenerative energy facilities, battery electric busses, railway vehicles and other commercial vehicles. company was acquired by the American automotive supplier BorgWarner.
Automotive Cells Company (ACC)	2020	Bruges, France	120 (planned for 2030)	Lithium-ion	Planned	Joint venture between SAFT, Mercedes-Benz and Stellantis. ACC intends to build two large scale production facilities for battery cell in France and Germany to supply electric vehicles.
Coslight India	2007	Una, India		Lithium-ion	Unknown	Electric Bus LFP batteries, EV LFP Batteries, E car LFP & NMC batteries.
GS Yuasa	1917	Kyoto, Japan		Lithium-ion	Mitsubishi	Joint ventures with Mitsubishi Motors, and Mitsubishi Corp. Provides batteries for Mitsubishi.
Hitachi	1910	Tokyo, Japan		Lithium-ion	Unknown	
Imperium3 New York (IM3NY)	2017		32 (planned for 2030)	Lithium-ion	Yes	Cobalt-free EV batteries for Lower end passenger EVs, Buses and Defence application. Cell developed and commercialised in partnership with Charge CCCV, also known as C4V and Australian company Magnis Energy Technologies, which has Nobel Laureate Professor Stanley Whittingham as an advisory director to the project and long time mentor to IM3NY chairman Dr Shailesh Upreti.
InoBat Auto	2019		32 (planned for 2026)	Lithium-ion	Planned	Launched the world first 'intelligent battery' in October 2020. Plans to partner with Rio Tinto to recycle its batteries Currently constructing a R&D Facility in Slovakia, with further plans for a 32GWh facility.
Leclanché	1909	Yverdon-les-Bains, Switzerland	2.3 (2024)	Lithium-ion (G-NMC & LTO)	Yes	Designs & manufactures proprietary G-NMC/LTO cells, modules & packs within its European facilities. Applications: Marine, Bus, Truck, Construction & Agriculture, GSE, Rail, Stationary & Specialty. Production capacity (Li-ion cells): 200MWh (2019) with roadmap to reach 2.3GWh by 2024.
Microvast	2006	Stafford, USA	4 (2021)	Lithium-ion (LTO, NMC, LFP)	Oshkosh Corporation; FPT	Specialize in cells (LTO, NMC, LFP), modules and packs for commercial vehicles.
NEC	1899	Tokyo, Japan		Lithium-ion	Nissan	Produced prototype batteries for Nissan. Automotive Energy Supply (AESC) is Nissan's joint venture with NEC.
Northvolt AB	2019	Stockholm, Sweden	32 (planned for 2025)	Lithium-ion	Planned	filed bankruptcy in November 2024. Factory production in Skellefteå, Sweden. Start of prototype production in 2022, scale up planned for 2024-25.
PowerCo (Volkswagen Group)	2019	Salzgitter, Germany	16	Lithium-ion	Planned	Initially planned JV with Northvolt AB in Salzgitter, Germany, for the electric vehicles of the Volkswagen Group. 2023 breakup of the Joint venture and renaming to PowerCo. Start of production was planned for end of 2023/early 2024. Real SOP was late 2025.
Octillion Power Systems	2009			Lithium-ion	Wuling; FNM	Lithium-ion battery supplier for the electric-vehicle battery market. Vehicles powered by Octillion batteries include China's Wuling Hongguang Mini and electric trucks produced by Brazilian manufacturer FNM (Fábrica Nacional de Motores).
OptimumNano Energy	2002	Shenzhen, China	5.5 (2019)	LFP	Unknown	Large Chinese manufacturer, mostly for domestic market.
Primearth EV Energy	1996	Kosai, Japan		NiMH, Lithium-ion	Toyota	a joint venture between Toyota and Panasonic. Former JV partner was Matsushita Electric Industrial Co. till the 2010s. Company will be renamed to Toyota Battery Co., Ltd. in October 2024. At least in the 90's produced batteries for Prius and RAV4.
SAFT	1918	Levallois-Perret, France		Lithium-ion	Planned	Since 2016 a subsidiary TotalEnergies. Saft is together Mercedes-Benz and Stellantis venture partner of ACC (see above).
Sanyo	1947	Osaka, Japan		NiMH	Ford; Honda; Suzuki	Provides NiMH batteries for Honda and Ford hybrid vehicles and Suzuki Swift.
SVOLT	2018	Changzhou, China	61+ (2026)	Lithium-ion (NMC, LFP)	GWM; Mini; Geely; Wuling; Voyah; Li Auto	Spun off from Great Wall Motors in 2018. Chinese name translates to "Hive Energy" or "Honeycomb Energy".
Verkor	2020	Grenoble, France	16 (planned for 2026)		Renault	European start-up with French mass center. supported by Renault. Aims for low-carbon batteries. Headquarters and R&D line in Grenoble, Gigafactory in Dunkirk, France
WeLion	2016	Beijing, China	6 (30 planned for 2025)	Lithium-ion	Nio	Supplier of semi-solid-state electrolyte NMC cells for Nio's 150 kWh swappable batteries. Has received government funding for research and development of solid-state batteries.
Xerotech Ltd.	2015	Galway, Ireland		Lithium-ion	Yes	Xerotech's Hibernium® battery platform is built on a modular platform, allowing for high flexibility and economies of scale. The Hibernium® battery platform is designed for off-highway vehicle OEMs in every industry, including: Mining, Construction, Rail, Marine, Defense, and Everything Else.
Zenergy	2019	Changshu, China	35.5+ (2025)	Lithium-ion (LFP)	GAC; Leapmotor; SGMW; SAIC-GM	Jiangsu Zhengli New Energy Battery Technology, Co

== List of smaller (<1GWh) EV battery and former cell manufacturers ==
Battery manufacturer	Year founded	Headquarters	Production capacity (GWh)	Type of battery	OEM customer	Notes
Aptiv	1994	Dublin, Ireland		LTO	Unknown	Delphi Automotive PLC.
BMZ Group	1994	Karlstein am Main, Germany		Lithium-ion	Unknown	Lithium-ion batteries for e-buses, e-forklifts, e-vehicles like Streetscooter, e.Go, KION, Eurabus.
Electrovaya	1996	Ontario, Canada		Lithium-ion	Toyota; Raymond	Signed deal to electrify Walmart forklifts. Have a strong presence in large distribution centers in Mexico, USA and Canada.
Ethium	1994	San Antonio, USA		LFP	No	Designs and manufactures forklift battery boxes under the branding Ethium.
Frey New Energy	2010			LFP	Yes	Manufacturer and distributor of lithium-ion battery cells, modules and customized packs for heavy-duty industrial EVs and machines, serving markets of mining, material handling, GSE, and other industrial applications.
Johnson Matthey Battery Systems	2006	Milton Keynes, United Kingdom		LFP	Rolls-Royce; Modec; RUF Automobile; Jaguar Cars; Land Rover; Electric Car Corporation; McLaren	Company formerly named Axeon. and is owned by Cummins.
Molicel	1998	Taipei, Taiwan		Lithium-ion	BMW	Formerly E-One Moli Energy.
Targray	2010	Kirkland, Canada		Lithium-ion	Yes	Major international supplier of advance materials for EV battery manufacturing and R&D. Notable products include cathode materials, anode materials, electrolyte, electrodes, metal foils, binders, battery packaging materials and lithium-ion cells.
Valence Technology	1989	Henderson, USA		LFP	Mercedes-Benz	Acquired by LithiumWerks in 2019.
VinES Energy Solutions	1993	Hanoi, Vietnam			VinFast	Member of VinGroup

== See also ==
- Electric vehicle battery
- List of production battery electric vehicles
- Electric vehicle industry in China
