= Ronart Cars =

UK automobile manufacturer

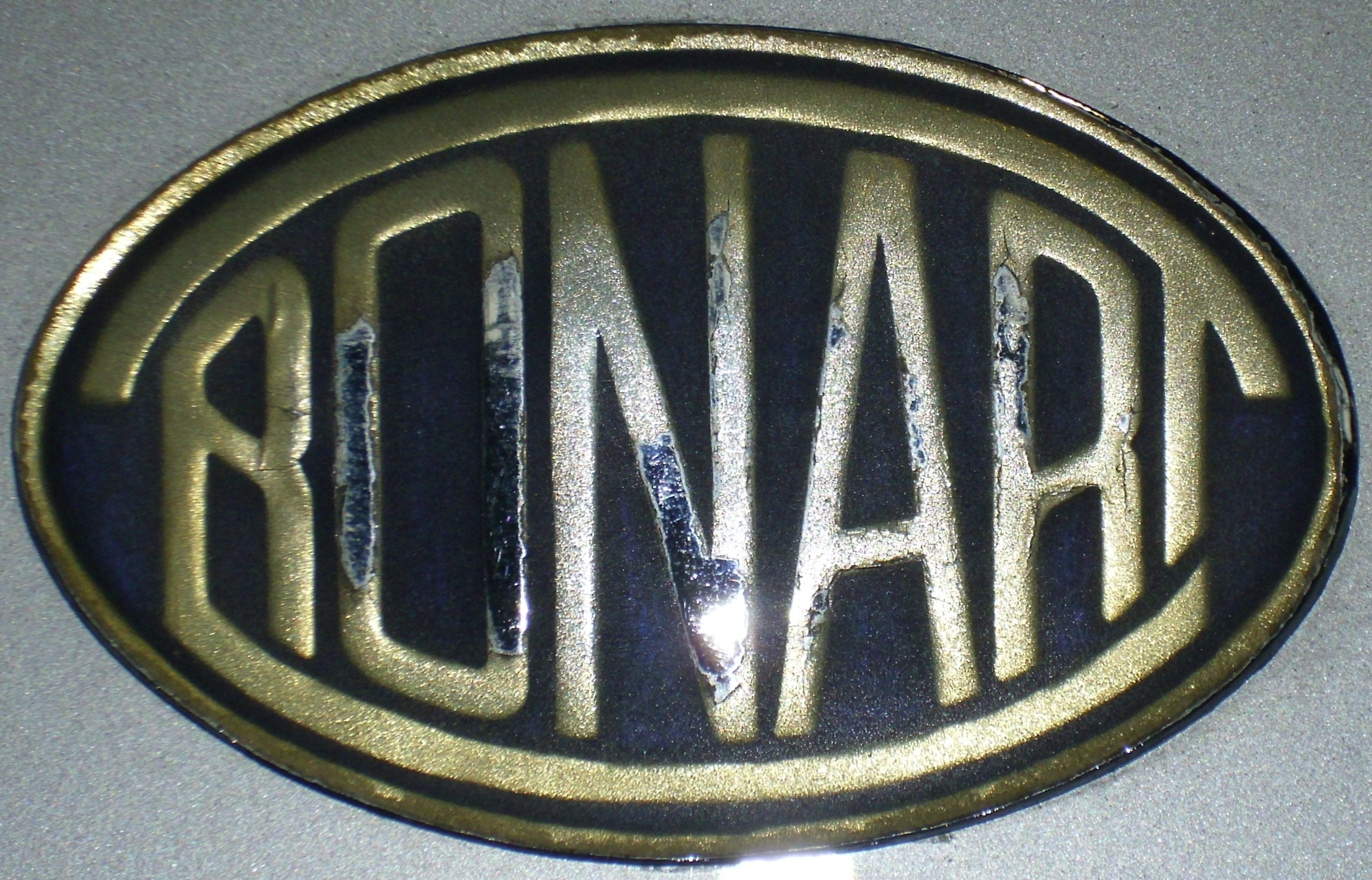
- Type: Private
- Industry: Automotive
- Founded: March 21, 1984; 42 years ago
- Founder: Rona and Arthur Wolstenholme
- Headquarters: Peterborough
- Products: W152, Lightning V8
- Website: http://ronart.co.uk/

Ronart Cars is a British sports car manufacturer and constructor of unique and bespoke sports racing cars. The company was founded in 1984 by Rona and Arthur Wolstenholme, based in Peterborough. The company designs and manufactures sports and racing cars for both road legal and track day use with unique designs from open wheel racing cars to modern day sports cars.

The W152 was the first car to be designed and produced by Ronart Cars. Wolstenholme initially had the idea in 1981 but the design and build of a prototype car began in 1984 and the car launched at the 1985 International Classic Car Show. Production started in early 1987. The Mk2 version of the Ronart W152 started production in 1996 which has continued until the present day.

A departure into more mainstream cars came in 1999 where the company took on new joint ownership and designed and built the carbon fibre Ronart Lightning V8, which they launched at the 1999 London Motor Show. More than twenty-four direct orders were taken at the show stand on its debut. Only a limited number of cars however were built before production ceased in 2003 after the new owners closed the business following a switch of investment into another car manufacturer.

In 2004, Wolstenholme, licensed the Vanwall brand and over the following ten years created and manufactured three new Vanwall car designs, the Grand Prix Racer, the Vanwall 2S and the replica Vanwall 58.

In 2006 Iain Sanderson joined Arthur Wolstenholme with Vanwall in the production of Vanwall cars and the W152. During which time they also started the Lightning Car Company specifically to create and develop a new car called the Lightning GT. This was an ultra modern technology, electric sports car with a design style based upon the original Lightning V8. The Lightning GT was launched at the 2008 International London Motor Show.

The W152 was manufactured under licence by Vanwall for ten years. Since then manufacturing has continued by Ronart.

The Ronart W152 is currently being produced from Ronart Cars Limited, Peterborough.

== Models ==
=== W152 ===
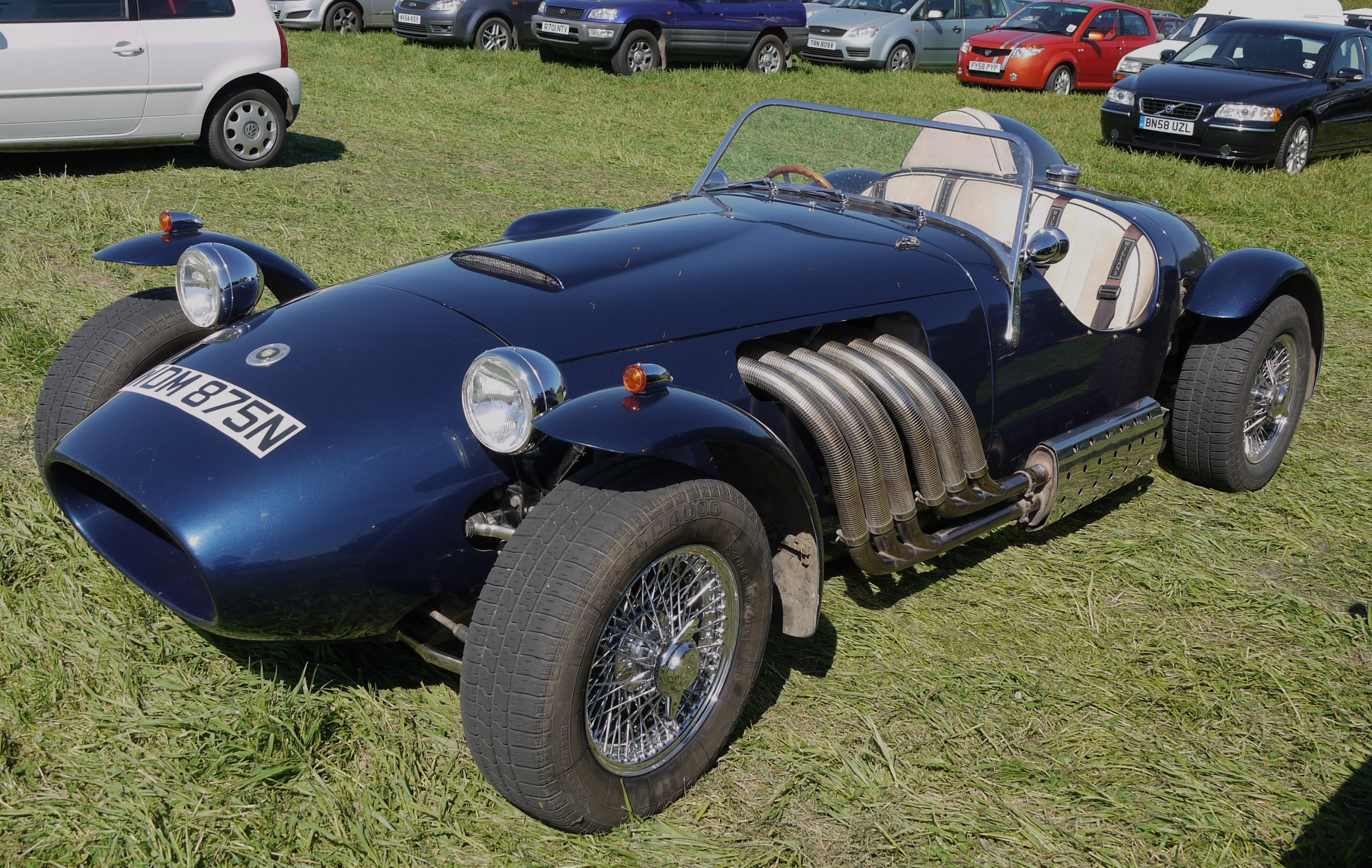
Ronart W152

The W152 was the first car to be designed and produced by Ronart Cars. Design began in 1981 and production started in 1986.

The W152's style is based on that of the front-engined Formula 1 cars of the 1940s and 1950s. The external exhaust system and "hump style" headrest are key design features of a car from that era. The W152 design however is not a copy but an original design with a reflection of many styles of cars from that era.

The MK1 chassis was originally designed by Spyder Engineering, who had made chassis for Lotus in the past. Like many Lotus cars, the W152 uses a backbone chassis. So, the chassis narrows in the centre, at the transmission tunnel and spreads out to all 4 corners. The MK 2 cars, produced since 1996 featured the chassis redesigned and built in-house. The chassis is normally powder coated or enameled in black.

The body comprises 11 sections/panels, the centre tub section, nose cone, bonnet, front side panels, rear section, boot lid and all four wings. The centre section is reinforced with a steel cage for safety and rigidity. There is also a roll-over hoop welded into the section which is hidden under the head rest. This section attaches to the chassis by mounting point at the rear of the cage and also at the front in the footwells. The cage also holds the seat belt mounting points. The nose cone houses the grille and is in the style of 50s and 60s racing cars. The side panels can have either nothing, 3 mesh covered holes or a large exhaust hole at the top. An S6 models would usually have 3 mesh covered holes on the intake side and a large exhaust hole on the other side. A V12 model would usually have the three mesh holes on both sides and also an exhaust hole just underneath that. Some owners have opted for mixed options, mainly because of different exhaust systems. Most earlier models also had louvers near the bottom of each side panel. The side repeaters are also positioned on the side panels. The bonnet has a large, central scoop and, on most S6 models, a bump above where the intake sits as the carburetors need clearance and would contact the bonnet otherwise. The rear section consists of the head fairing, and fuel filler cap. On later cars (Mk.II specifically), there is also a boot in the rear section. The wings are fixed to the chassis and are positioned above each wheel. The front wings have the front indicators on. The rear wings have the rear lights, brake lights, indicators and reflectors. The number plate is mounted on the right rear wing. Body panels are made out of aluminium, carbon fibre or typically fibreglass (GRP)

The W152's mechanicals are from a Jaguar XJ from 1968–1986. There are three different engine options in a W152, the Jaguar XK6, AJ6 or V12. Any appropriate gearbox can be used but normally a suitable manual gearbox from a Jaguar is used. The W152 uses the independent rear suspension (IRS) unit and front wishbones from the Jaguar donor car but instead of using the standard springs and shock absorbers, it utilises modern coil over shocks. The steering rack is sourced from an MGB and uses extenders to the track-rod ends to suit the wider track of the car. The car uses the standard Jaguar brake calipers and discs but uses a different, split system pedal box, remote fluid reservoirs and twin servos. Most cars up until about 2011 used a custom-built pedal box, but they now use an OBP pedal box. The front suspension arms and steering arm and track rod end extensions are usually nickel-plated.

The W152, does not have any doors (and on most cars) nor a windscreen, instead it uses two small Brooklands aero screens in the style of those classic Formula 1 cars. It has two seats which share a backrest.

The W152 has undergone certification with seatbelt certification witnessed to full EU standards that was carried out by Manchester University (STATUS). Also, Ronart were one of the first specialist car manufacturer to submit and achieve an A1 pass in a vehicle hydropulse test. This series of tests on a W152 aged the chassis and suspension components for an equivalent 100,000 miles within a two-week period. Engineering structures with crack detection were examined following the tests.

=== Lightning V8 ===
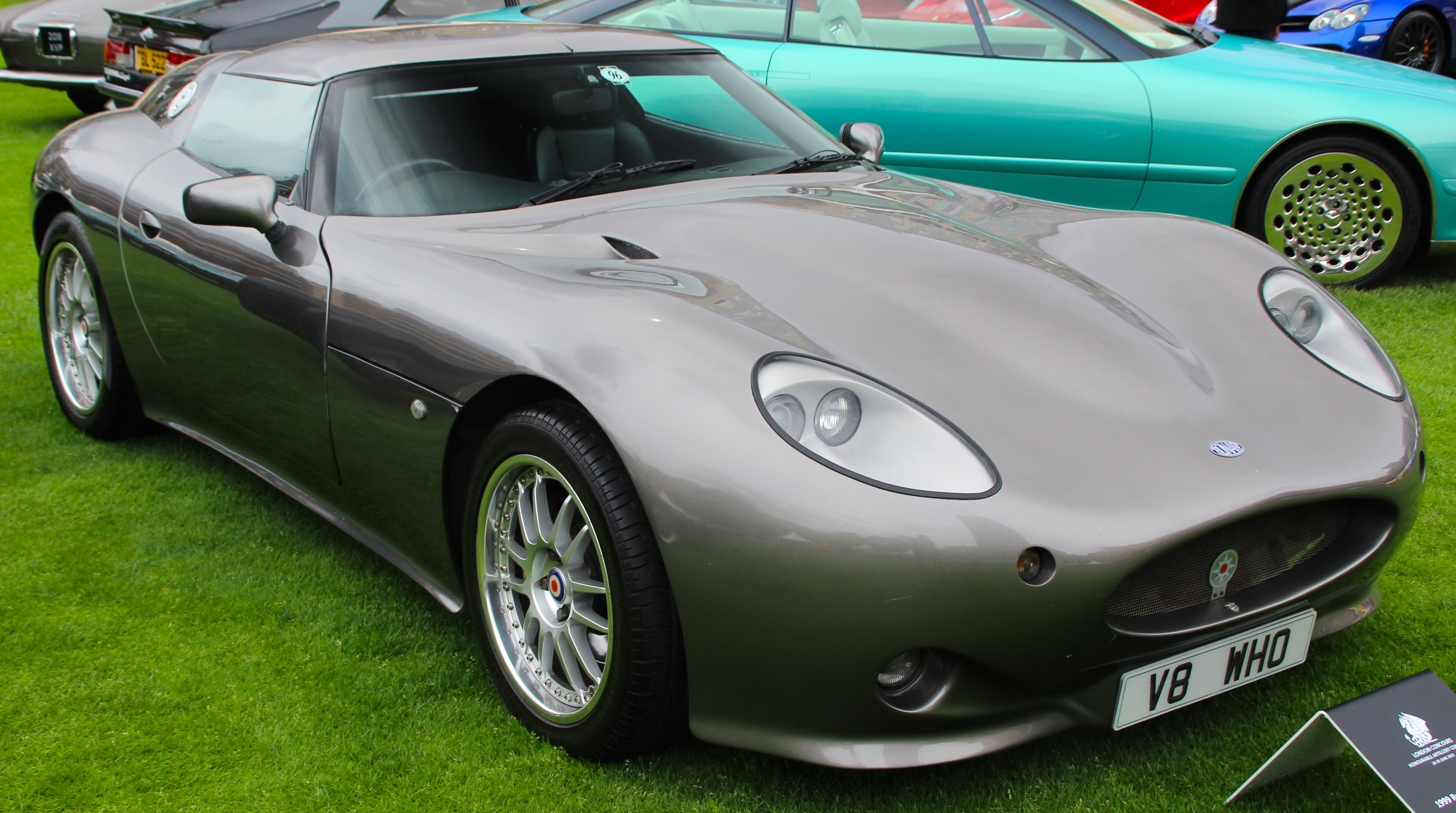
Ronart Lightning

The Ronart Lightning V8 was launched at the 1999 International London Motor Show on 19 October 1999, only six months after work started on the project. The successful launch of the concept car saw Ronart receiving direct twenty-four orders for the Lightning sports car.

Work started in earnest in 2000 and changes were made to enhance the vehicles lines and shape as well as development of interior/chassis and exterior components. Two further concept shells were built until the road going prototype car was completed.

The Lightning V8 was powered by a Ford Mustang SVT Cobra providing 320BHP as standard with optional 500BHP supercharged version. The last two cars built were fitted with superchargers. The V8 was fitted up to a five speed manual gearbox and with a Hydralock differential for improved traction.

The car featured interior refinements such as power operated heated and cooled Recaro seats, electric windscreen demist with electric windows and mirrors, leather upholstery reversing camera and satellite navigation.

The chassis was of a multi-tubular spaceframe construction which when combined with a lightweight carbon fibre body was designed to be a full convertible. Specialist Rhoddy Harvey-Bailey at H.B.Engineering worked on the handling characteristics and carried out road going testing and development of both chassis and suspension.

During the year 2000/2001 development work was carried out on a new carbon fibre process and material called SPRINT Technology. Ronart were the first to use this new low-cost material and process for car body production. Pre-production started in 2002 with setting up of a build and manufacturing line at Westwood Farm.

In June 2003 the new owners changed the company's business strategy and closed the factory after pulling out and investing in another car company. Lightning V8 production ceased after only seven cars were built and delivered to customers, many more current active orders were cancelled when production ended.
