= Lightning Car Company =

British sports car company

- Company type: Private
- Industry: Automotive
- Founded: 18 January 2007
- Defunct: 19 December 2023
- Fate: Dissolved
- Headquarters: Coventry, United Kingdom
- Products: Cars
- Owner: Iain Sanderson (96%)
- Website: https://lightninggt.com

The Lightning Car Company was a British sports car developer, originally based in Fulham and Peterborough, the company relocated to Coventry and was focused on the development and production of high performance electric sports cars.

The company was dissolved in December 2023.

== Lightning GT ==
The firm's first product, the eponymous Lightning GT, was unveiled in 2008 where it won Car of The Show at the last Excel London Motor Show. It was loosely based on an extant internal-combustion vehicle from Ronart Cars. It incorporated quick-charging lithium-titanate batteries from Altairnano into a body made from carbon fiber. The Lightning GT employed rear-wheel drive from two synchronous motors to accelerate to 60 miles per hour (97 km/h) in less than 4 seconds and had an expected usable range of 150 miles (240 km) on a single battery charge, with a range extender battery pack option increasing this to 225 miles (360 km).

The company was taking orders for 2012 delivery, this was later moved back to 2014, and subsequently 2017. The prototype was displayed at the Coventry Motofest, featuring a revised Magtec power train. The cars were also shown at the London Motor Show in 2016, in Suffolk, and in Paris in 2019.

One of the two completed cars is being displayed at the British Motor Museum until 2024.

== See also ==
- List of production battery electric vehicles
- List of electric cars currently available

== Notes ==
- 3. Green Pioneers: Can I interest you in an electric supercar? Sunday Times article 24 October 2010
