= Frédéric Lissalde =

American business executive

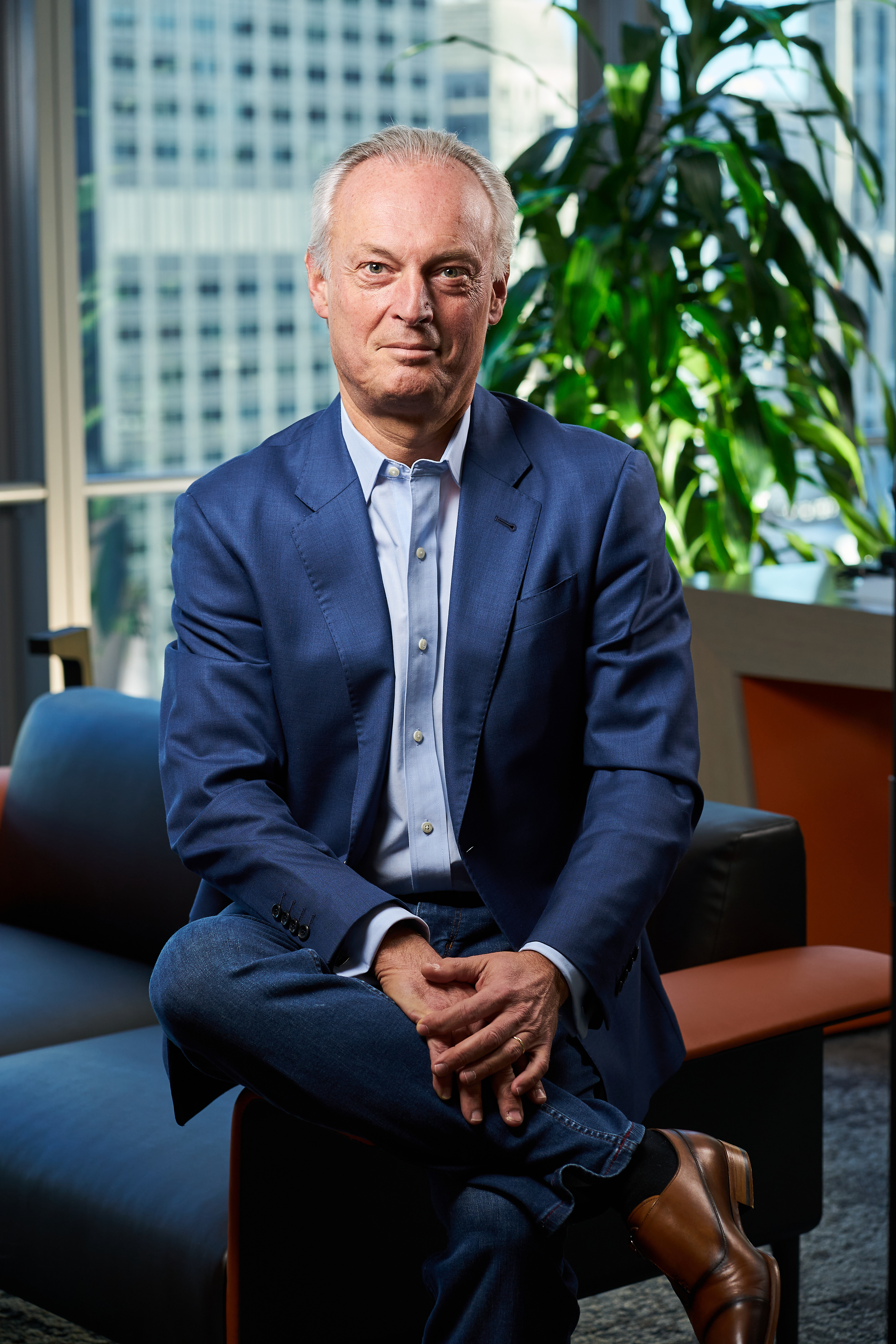

Frédéric Lissalde (born July 17, 1967) is the president and chief executive officer (CEO) of BorgWarner Inc.

== Career ==
Lissalde was appointed to this role on Aug. 1, 2018, taking over for retiring president and CEO, James Verrier.

Before being named to his current position, Lissalde served as executive vice president and chief operating officer. Since joining BorgWarner in 2000, Lissalde has held several positions including president and general manager of BorgWarner Turbo Systems, the company’s largest business; vice president and general manager of BorgWarner Transmission Systems; and vice president of global sales and marketing of BorgWarner Drivetrain Systems. Lissalde also served as the general manager of several BorgWarner Drivetrain Systems operations in Europe.

In addition to his responsibilities as president and CEO of BorgWarner, Lissalde is a member of the Business Roundtable.

In 2019, Lissalde joined the CEO Action for Diversity & Inclusion, a CEO driven business commitment to advance diversity and inclusion in the workplace.

Prior to joining BorgWarner, Lissalde held positions at Valeo and ZF Friedrichshafen AG in program management, engineering, operations and sales roles throughout the U.K., Japan and France.

== Compensation ==
In 2023, Lissalde's total compensation at BorgWarner was $19.3 million, or 490 times the median employee pay at BorgWarner for that year.

== Education ==
Lissalde attended Ecole Nationale Supérieure d’Arts et Métiers (ENSAM), where he earned a Master of Engineering degree. He has a Master’s of Business Administration from HEC Paris (ISA) and is also a graduate of executive courses at INSEAD, Harvard University and Massachusetts Institute of Technology.

== Awards ==
Lissalde was honored with the Nessim Habif Award in March 2023.

== Personal life ==
Lissalde was born in Paris and grew up in Tours, France. Lissalde is married with three children.
