= Microvast =

Lithium ion battery company

Microvast Holdings, Inc.
- Type: Public
- Traded as: Nasdaq: MVST
- ISIN: US59516C1062
- Industry: Lithium-ion battery manufacturing
- Founded: 2006; 20 years ago
- Founder: Yang Wu
- Headquarters: Houston, Texas, United States
- Key people: Yang Wu (chairman and CEO)
- Products: Lithium-ion battery cells, modules, battery packs and energy storage systems
- Revenue: US$427.5 million (2025)
- Number of employees: 1,908 (2025)
- Website: microvast.com

Microvast Holdings, Inc. is a battery technology company headquartered in Stafford, Texas, and publicly traded on the NASDAQ Stock Exchange. It designs, develops and manufactures battery components and systems primarily for electric commercial vehicles and utility-scale energy storage systems (ESS). Microvast has manufacturing facilities in the United States, China, and Germany.

== History ==
Microvast was founded by Yang Wu in 2006 in Houston, Texas, along with its Chinese subsidiary, Microvast Power Systems (Chinese: 微宏动力系统) in Huzhou, China. It introduced its first generation of batteries in 2009, with manufacturing starting in 2010 in Huzhou factory.

By March, 2017, it began construction on its "Phase III" production facility in Huzhou.

In 2019, the company, in a joint work with researchers from Argonne National Laboratory won a R&D 100 award for a novel "High-energy density and safe battery system".

In July 2020, Microvast inaugurated its new Germany factory in Ludwigsfelde, with production planned to start in March 2021.

On February 10, 2021, Tennessee officials and Microvast announced that the company will establish a new manufacturing facility in Clarksville to manufacture battery cells, modules and packs, with the production expected to begin in the summer of 2022.

On July 26, 2021, the company went public through a merger with a special-purpose acquisition company.

On November 1, 2021, Microvast opened a new R&D center in Orlando, Florida.

Microvast suspended construction of its planned battery-cell factory in Clarksville in 2024 because of funding shortages. The company then began installing a smaller battery-pack assembly line at the site.

=== Canceled federal grant ===
On Oct. 19, 2022 the U.S. Department of Energy released "Bipartisan Infrastructure Law Battery Materials Processing and Battery Manufacturing & Recycling Funding Opportunity Announcement", awarding US$2.8 billion to a number of public and private US companies. The company was awarded US$200 million to support development of a Thermally Stable Polyaramid Separator Manufacturing Plant in Clarksville, Tennessee, in partnership with General Motors. The federal grant generated criticism from U.S. representative Frank Lucas and U.S. senator John Barrasso.

In May 2023, the U.S. Department of Energy canceled the $200 million award to Microvast. A planned Microvast plant in Hopkinsville, Kentucky was halted as a result.

== See also ==
- List of electric-vehicle-battery manufacturers
- Lithium-titanate battery
