= Lithium-titanate battery =

Fast rechargeable lithium ion battery

lithium-titanate battery
- Specific energy: 60–110 Wh/kg
- Energy density: 177–202 Wh/L
- Cycle durability: 6000–+45000 cycles
- Nominal cell voltage: 2.3 V

The lithium-titanate battery, or lithium-titanium-oxide (LTO) battery, is a type of rechargeable battery with a longer cycle life, a wider operating-temperature range, and greater tolerance for rapid charging and discharging than other lithium-ion batteries. The primary disadvantages of LTO batteries are their higher purchase cost per kWh and their lower energy density.

== Uses ==
Titanate batteries have been used in certain Japanese-only versions of Mitsubishi's i-MiEV electric vehicle as well as Honda's EV-neo electric bike and Fit EV. They are increasingly used in rail transport in electrified corridors. Because of the battery's high level of safety and recharge capabilities, LTO batteries are used in car audio applications as well as mobile medical devices.

An LTO battery is also used in the S-Pen that comes with the Samsung Galaxy Note 20 Ultra 5G.

The Combustion Predictive Thermometer is described as using an LTO battery. According to Combustion Inc., this allows it to safely survive temperatures up to 105 °C (221 °F) inside of ovens.

== Chemistry ==
A lithium-titanate battery is a type of lithium-ion battery that uses lithium-titanate nanocrystals, instead of graphite, on the surface of its anode. Compared to graphite, lithium-titanate has a lower theoretical specific capacity (175 vs 372 mAh/g), but also a lower volume change during lithiation/delithiation (0.2% vs 10%). The redox potential of Li+ intercalation into titanium oxides is more positive than that of Li+ intercalation into graphite. This makes fast charging at higher currents safer with lithium titanate than with carbon anodes, as lithium dendrites are less likely to form. Lithium-titanate cells last for 6000 to 30000 charge cycles; a life cycle of ~1000 cycles before reaching 80% capacity is possible when charged and discharged at 55 °C (131 °F), rather than the standard 25 °C (77 °F).

A disadvantage of lithium-titanate batteries is their lower inherent voltage (2.4 V), which leads to a lower specific energy (about 30–110 Wh/kg) than conventional lithium-ion battery technologies, which have an inherent voltage of 3.7 V. Some lithium-titanate batteries, however, have an volumetric energy density of up to 177 Wh/L.

== Brands and uses ==
=== Log 9 scientific materials ===
The company Log9 is working to introduce its tropicalized-ion battery (TiB) backed by lithium ferro-phosphate (LFP) and lithium-titanium-oxide (LTO) battery chemistries. LFP and LTO battery chemistries are better suited to more tropical climates due to their wider range of operating temperatures.

=== Altairnano ===
Altairnano produces lithium-titanate batteries under the "Nanosafe" line, mainly for battery electric vehicles. Vehicle manufacturers that have announced plans to use Altairnano batteries include Lightning Car Company, which plans to use them for the Lightning GT, an electric sports car; Phoenix Motorcars, for use in its electric sport-utility vehicles; and in Proterra, its electric EcoRide BE35 lightweight 35-foot bus.

Altairnano also deployed lithium-titanate energy-storage systems for electric-grid ancillary services as well as military applications.

=== Grinergy ===
Grinergy is a South Korean battery manufacturer founded in 2017. It offers commercial and Warfighter military grade LTO battery technology. Grinergy is a 2023 CES Innovation Honoree.

=== Leclanché ===
Leclanché is a Swiss battery manufacturer founded in 1909. In 2006, it acquired Bullith AG to establish a lithium-ion manufacturing line in Germany. In 2014, its TiBox product entered the market with an energy capacity of 3.2 kWh and an expected service life of 15,000 cycles.

=== Microvast ===
Microvast, based in Houston, Texas, makes a lithium-titanate battery that it calls "LpTO". In 2011, the world's first ultrafast charge bus fleet was launched in Chongqing, China. An 80 kWh LpTO battery system was installed in 37 twelve-meter electric buses, which can be fully charged within 10 minutes with a 400 kW charger.

As of 2014, a British bus OEM, Wrightbus, began using Microvast LpTO batteries for 1,000 units of double-decker New Routemaster buses. An 18 kWh LpTO battery system is used to replace the initial Lithium Iron Phosphate battery because the LFP battery encountered performance failure.

As of 2015, the European ZeEUS (zero emission urban transport system) was first offered. Its VDL bus uses a 62.5 kWh LpTO battery system from Microvast for a demonstration project.

As of 2016, the world's largest automated port, PSA TUAS, began using the Microvast LpTO for 22 electric AGVs as a first phase of a project for horizontal container transportation.

=== Samsung ===
The Bluetooth-enabled S-Pen in the Samsung Galaxy Note 10 and 10+ contains a lithium-titanate battery which has a stand-by time of ten hours.

=== Maxell ===
Seiko used lithium-titanate batteries produced by Maxell in its Kinetic (automatic quartz) wristwatches. Earlier Kinetic watches used a capacitor to store energy, but the battery provides a larger capacity and a longer service life. A technician can easily replace the battery when its capacity eventually deteriorates to an unacceptable level.

=== Stadler ===
The British Rail Class 93 tri-mode locomotives built by Stadler Rail use lithium-titanate batteries to allow the train to run on unelectrified lines. These liquid cooled cells can be charged while under the overhead lines, or from the onboard diesel engine when the full output is not needed for traction.

=== Toshiba ===
An example of an SCiB battery

In 2007, Toshiba released a lithium-titanate battery, dubbed "Super Charge Ion Battery" (SCiB). The battery is designed to offer 90% charge capacity in ten minutes.

SCiB batteries are used in the Schwinn Tailwind electric bike. Toshiba has also demonstrated its use as a prototype laptop battery. Toshiba SCiB batteries are used in a Japan-only version of Mitsubishi's i-MiEV and Minicab MiEV electric vehicles, and Honda uses them in its EV-neo electric bike and Fit EV, which came to market in the summer of 2012. JR Central's N700S Shinkansen uses SCiB batteries to operate at low speed in the event of a disruption to overhead power.

The Toshiba lithium-titanate battery has a nominal voltage of 2.3 V and relatively low energy density, but offers a long cycle life, high charge and discharge rates, and a wide operating-temperature range.

In 2024, Toshiba specified an expected life of 45,000 cycles at 10C for its "high power" 2.9 Ah SCiB cell, and 20,000 cycles at 3C for its "high energy" 23 Ah cell. At some loss in expected cycle life, these cells can be charged extremely rapidly from 0% to 80% of capacity: in 1 minute (i.e. at 48C, ~140A) for the 2.9 Ah cell, and in 6 minutes (i.e. at 8C, ~184A) for the 23 Ah cell (1C is the rate of charge or discharge equal to the nominal capacity in 1 hour, 10C is ten times that rate, and so on). In April 2024, four Siemens Mireo Plus B battery-electric trains were placed into service, powered by Toshiba LTO cells with an expected service life of 15 years.

=== YABO ===
YABO Power Technology released a lithium-titanate battery in 2012. The standard model YB-LITE2344 2.4 V/15 Ah battery cell has been used in electric vehicle and energy storage systems.

=== Yinlong Energy ===
Gree introduced its Yinlong Battery Technology, a type of fast-charging LTO (lithium-titanate) battery, which can operate in extreme temperature conditions. The batteries have an operational life-span up to 10 years. Yinlong Energy provides batteries for such uses as automobiles and energy storage.

== See also ==
- List of battery types
- List of battery sizes
- Comparison of battery types
- Battery (electricity)
- Electrochemical cell
- Energy storage
- Fuel cell
- Lithium iron phosphate battery
