= Lightning GT =

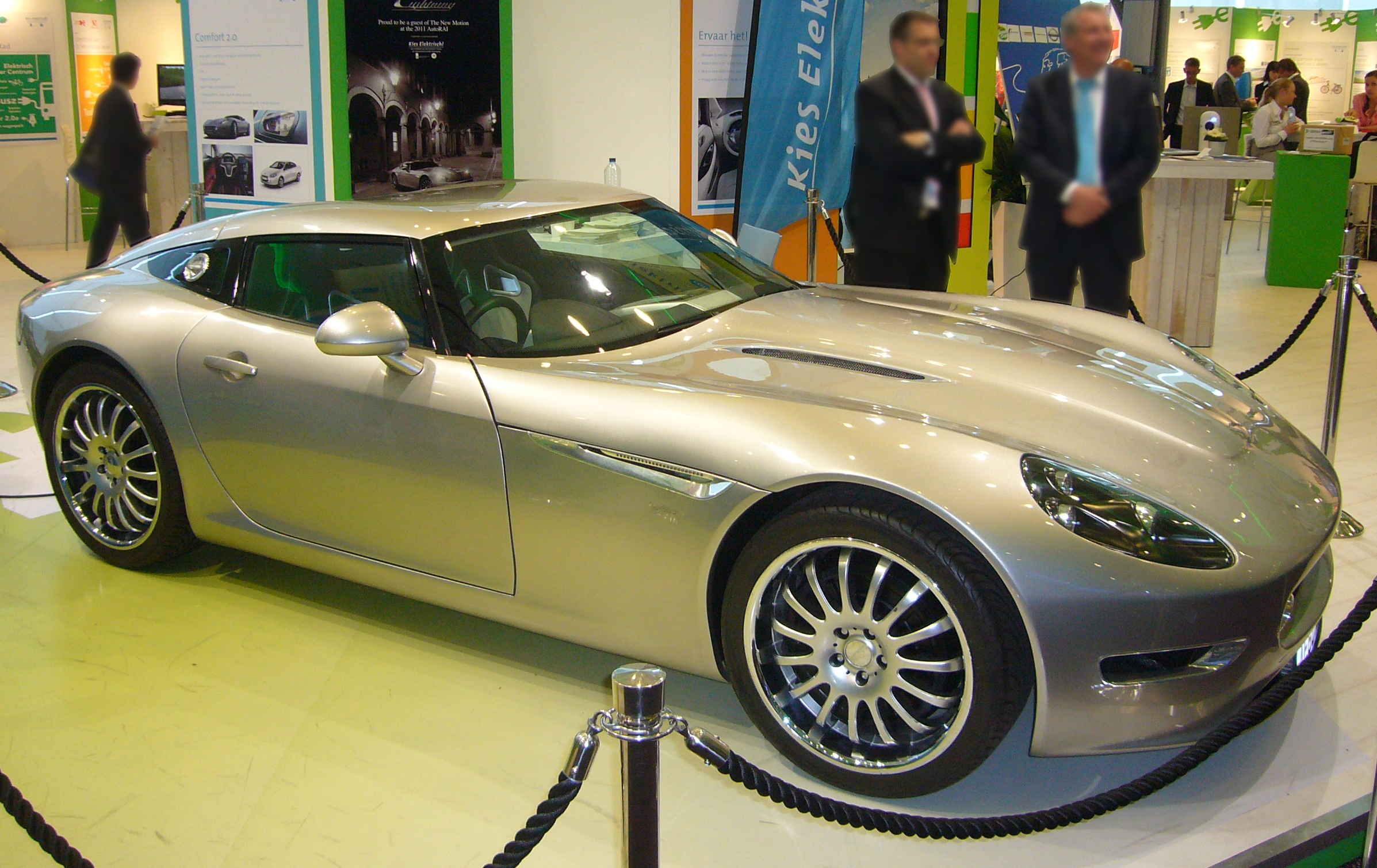

Overview
- Manufacturer: Lightning Car Company
- Production: Not in production
- Assembly: UK
- Designer: Daniel Durrant of Lightning Car Co and Chris Longmore Drive Design

Body and chassis
- Class: Sports car
- Body style: 2-seat coupé
- Layout: Rear motor, rear-wheel drive

Powertrain
- Electric motor: 2×150 kW synchronous
- Power output: 402 hp (300 kW; 408 PS)
- Transmission: 5.5:1 single-speed gear reduction, electronic differential
- Battery: 2×22 kWh LTO Altairnano
- Electric range: 322 km (200 mi)
- Plug-in charging: 9–16.6 kW (AC)

Dimensions
- Wheelbase: 2,590 mm (102.0 in)
- Length: 4,445 mm (175.0 in)
- Width: 1,940 mm (76.4 in)
- Height: 1,200 mm (47.2 in)
- Kerb weight: 1,850 kg (4,079 lb)

The Lightning GT was a battery-electric sports car under development by the Lightning Car Company, a London-based privately owned and funded business.

The project was initially unveiled to the public in July 2008 at the British International Motor Show, with deliveries originally expected in 2009, but without funding the project has effectively been on hold in recent times.

The GT was displayed at the 2014 Low Carbon Vehicle Event with Magtec. The GT was displayed at the London Motor Show in May 2016 as one of the main features and placed in front of the show entrance where anecdotally it received great critical acclaim for its enduring styling. The Lightning was in Paris where it was shown by a French manufacturer to their Asian partner with a view to a long term EU and Asia association.

The silver Lightning GT show car was accepted for placement at the British Motor Museum where it is currently on display.

== Technical details ==
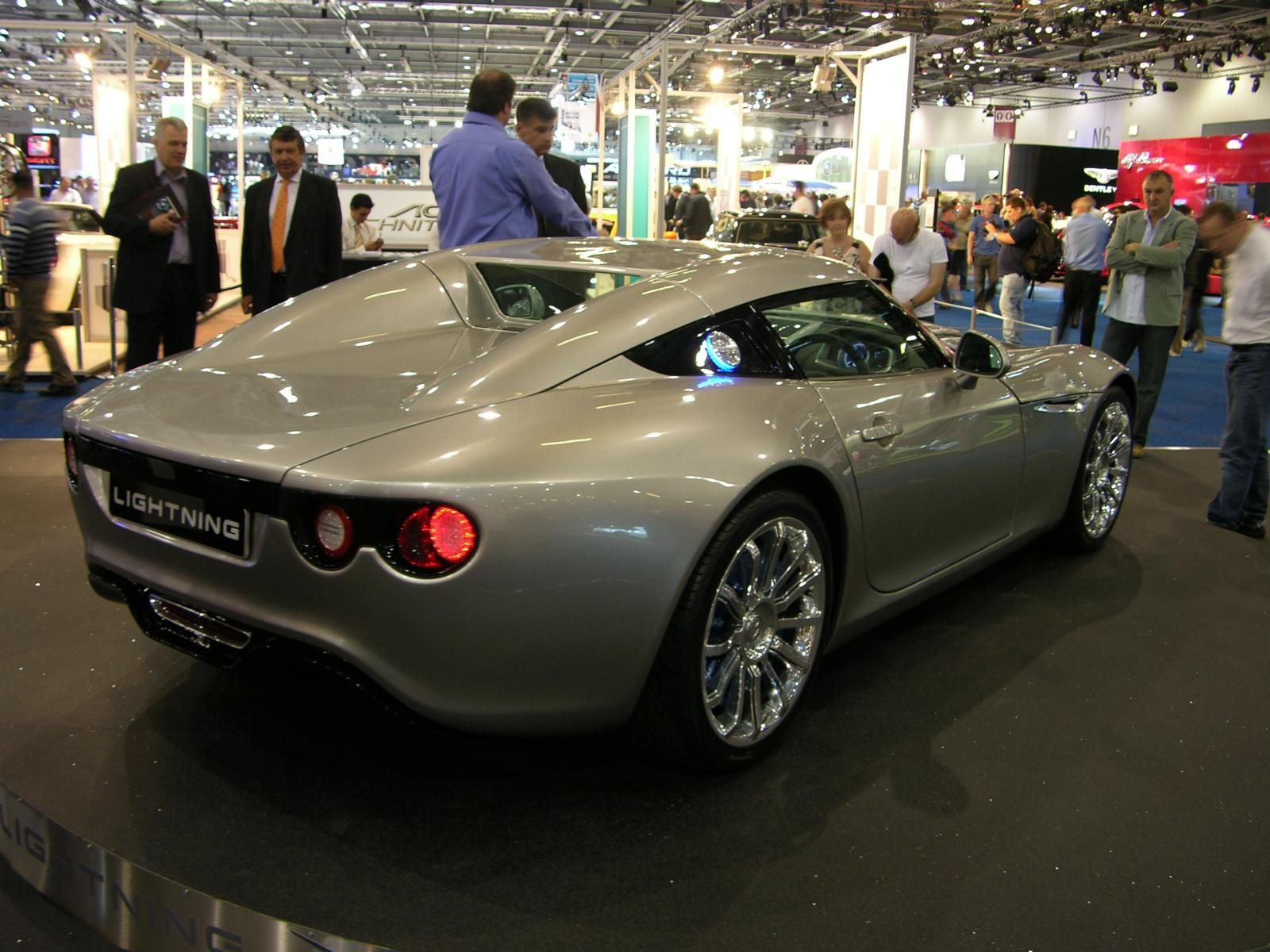
Lightning GT at the London Motor Show in 2008 where it won 'Most Impressive Car of Show' in an online MSN poll.

The first prototype was powered by four in-wheel motors with a combined power output of 700 bhp (710 PS; 522 kW), but the production vehicles were to have a revised electric drivetrain.

The car is powered by twin rear-mounted synchronous motors, driving through independent reduction gearboxes under electronic torque control. The powertrain system is sourced from MAGTEC, the leading UK powertrain manufacturer, providing rear-wheel drive and a peak power output capability of 300 kW (408 PS; 402 bhp) with 4,000 N⋅m (2,950 lb⋅ft) of torque available at the wheels.

The Lightning GT accelerates to 97 km/h (60 mph) in less than 4 seconds and is geared for a top speed over 300 km/h (185 mph). Its body will be made from carbon fibre and the chassis from a honeycomb aluminium structure. This unique H chassis will also house the battery modules which when integrated add massive torsional and beam strength. Final assembly location has yet to be determined.

A small amount of the development of the GT was assisted with a grant from the UK Government's Technical Strategy Board, as part of the EEMS Consortium. The Lightning GT development car excelled as a part of this consortium with 100% drivetrain and battery reliability over a full years monitored testing. The GT covered more miles than the rest of the consortium combined.

== Battery ==
The standard battery specification includes two 22 kWh Altairnano lithium-titanate battery pack 'strings'. The 9 kW standard onboard charger can fully recharge the batteries in five hours from a dedicated 32amp wired socket or 12 hours from any standard socket. An optional on-board charger connected to a suitable dedicated domestic power source can recharge the car from zero in 2.5 hours. A full charge will give the vehicle a 'usable' mixed use range of over 322 km (200 miles). Lightning are developing further battery combinations to take the range further on a standard pack. A range extender option is being developed which will enable significantly longer journeys.

== See also ==
- List of electric cars currently available
- Tesla Roadster (2008)
- Venturi Fétish
- AMG E-Cell
