= Akasol =

German EV battery manufacturer

Akasol AG
- Type: Aktiengesellschaft
- Founded: 2008; 18 years ago
- Headquarters: Darmstadt, Germany
- Key people: Sven Schulz (CEO), Carsten Bovenschen (CFO)
- Products: lithium-ion cells for vehicles and renewable energy systems
- Number of employees: 284 (as of 2019)
- Website: akasol.com

Akasol AG is a German manufacturer of batteries for electric vehicles. Akasol was founded in 2008. Its headquarters and main manufacturing site are located in Darmstadt. A manufacturing site in Detroit was opened in 2019. In 2021, the company was acquired by the American automotive supplier BorgWarner.

== History ==
The Company emerged from a solar technology team founded in 1989 at the Darmstadt University of Technology's Department of Electrical Engineering and Information Technology. The student team developed a number of solar and battery driven cars, aiming at low energy consumption.

In 2008, members of the team founded the Akasol Engineering GmbH, a for-profit company for developing Lithium-ion batteries and an electric car suitable for everyday use. The name was changed to Akasol GmbH in 2012.

In June 2018 the company went public as Akasol AG. Starting from June 2021, BorgWarner took over a majority of Akasol.

In August 2021, a factory with 15,000 m^{2}, called "Gigafactory 1" went operational in Darmstadt. Production capacity is up to 1 GWh during the first stage, and by 2022 is planned to increase to 2.5 GWh.
