= BorgWarner =

American automotive supply company

BorgWarner Inc.
- Type: Public
- Traded as: NYSE: BWA; S&P 400 component
- Industry: Automotive
- Founded: 1880; 146 years ago
- Headquarters: Auburn Hills, Michigan, U.S.
- Number of locations: 92, in 24 countries
- Area served: Worldwide
- Key people: Joseph (Joe) F. Fadool (President and Chief Executive Officer)
- Revenue: ▲US$14.3 billion (2025)
- Net income: ▼US$277 million (2025)
- Number of employees: 38,300 (2024)
- Divisions: Air management, E-propulsion & Drivetrain
- Website: borgwarner.com

BorgWarner Inc. is an American automotive and e-mobility supplier headquartered in Auburn Hills, Michigan. As of 2023, the company maintains production facilities and sites at 92 locations in 24 countries, and generates revenues of US$14.2 billion, while employing around 39,900 people. The company is one of the 25 largest automotive suppliers in the world. Since February 2025, Joseph F. Fadool has been CEO of BorgWarner Inc.

== History ==
=== Early history ===
Borg-Warner Corporation was formed out of several disparate manufacturers in the United States and abroad in 1928: Morse Equalizing Spring Company (industrial producer of automotive timing chains), Borg & Beck, Marvel-Schebler, Long Manufacturing (manufacturer of automobile radiators), Warner Gear (producer of manual transmissions; founded by Abbott Johnson of Muncie, Indiana) and Mechanics Universal Joint (producer of transmissions). Morse Equalizing Spring Company was the oldest forerunner, founded in 1880.

=== 1930–1950: Business development and innovations ===
In the next decade, Warner Gear was one of the first automotive suppliers to develop its own synchromesh transmission – the 'synchronizer' – a device that made a manual transmission's gear teeth mesh together with ease for smooth shifting, making synchromesh transmissions broadly available; Morse Chain brought out its first roller chain; and BorgWarner's self-contained overdrive transmission was introduced, with Chrysler and 11 other automakers purchasing the transmissions. BorgWarner Automotive Service Parts Division was also founded in the 1930s, and in 1936, the company commissioned a sterling silver trophy for the Indianapolis 500 (the Borg-Warner Trophy). In 1937, Stieber Rollkupplung GmbH (the predecessor to BorgWarner GmbH) was founded in Munich in 1937. In the prewar 1940s, BorgWarner created its Spring Division (to supply automatic transmission parts), began working on transfer cases, and soon directed its attention to World War II production needs. In 1950, it developed its first lock-up torque converter, a three-speed automatic transmission (the 'Ford-O-Matic'), along with Holley brand Borg & Beck Carburetors. Studebaker and Ford initiated long-term cooperations in regard to the newly developed technologies. The company's automotive sales reached over $200 million at the time.

=== 1950s–1970s: Expansion and diversification ===
As the 1950s continued, BorgWarner expanded its operations, establishing Borg & Beck do Brasil South America and setting up new facilities in Simcoe, Ontario, and Letchworth (England). In 1957, the T-10 4-speed transmission was introduced initially as a Corvette exclusive, it was soon used by all major American automakers through the 1980s. The English facility was soon producing Warner Gear's overdrive units and the Model D.G. automatic transmission. Marvel-Schebler was developing fuel injection systems, while BorgWarner developed a line of paper-related wet friction components. Later on, BorgWarner acquired Coote & Jurgenson, an Australian transmission producer for cars and tractors in 1957. Three years later, Brummer Seal Company was merged into BorgWarner's Spring Division. In 1962, BorgWarner expanded into Mexico, and into Asia with two Japanese joint ventures (NSK-Warner and Tsubakimoto-Morse). In 1969, Aisin-Warner was formed as another joint venture in Japan to build automatic transmissions. The following year, BorgWarner acquired the Massachusetts-based Nu-Era Gear and developed the Model 45 automatic transmission. Marvel-Schebler expanded by merging with Tillotson Carburetor in 1971. In 1973, BorgWarner introduced its full-time, four-wheel drive (4WD) transfer cases, while a new manufacturing site opened in Ireland. Over the next several years, came the introduction of the Model T-50 five-speed transmission and continuously variable transmissions for commercial vehicles. Further, expansion took place with new plants in Arkansas and New York. BorgWarner also diversified into several other industries, while its automotive division remained contributing upwards of 50 percent of BorgWarner's total revenue.

=== 1980s: Consolidation ===
In 1979, BorgWarner's overall sales topped $2.7 billion. This was due in part to its continuing improvement of the T-4 and T-5 manual transmissions and its production of new, lightweight Transfer cases. BorgWarner also restructured itself by selling Morse Industrial and its automotive service parts divisions in 1981. Three years later, the company consolidated its automotive operations under the umbrella of the Borg-Warner Automotive Inc. Sales for the newly named automotive conglomerate topped $1 billion in 1984 and the company employed around 10,000 people. It also produced its one-millionth T-5 manual transmission that year, while continuing its consolidation. During this time, Warner Gear was renamed Transmission Systems, Borg & Beck was renamed Clutch Systems, and Marvel-Schebler became known as Control Systems. Additionally, the company opened sales offices in Frankfurt, São Paulo, Seoul, and Tokyo and signed a licensing agreement with Nanjing Motor Works of Beijing. Following the consolidation, in 1987, Borg-Warner Corporation ceased to exist as a result of a series of complex financial transactions involving Merrill, although a new company of the same name (still BorgWarner Corporation) continued the business. At the same time, Borg-Warner Automotive Inc. became a subsidiary of the new mother company, Borg-Warner Corporation, later known as Borg-Warner Security Corporation. Around 1990, BorgWarner's transfer case technology was introduced for heavy duty and all-wheel drive models from General Motors. The company also developed the new 1354 transmission model for Ford Explorers and Ranger trucks, while the 'touch drive' model was installed in all F-series trucks.

=== 1990s: Further development and growth ===
In the early 1990s, Ford signed another sole-source agreement for the rest of the decade. Meanwhile, the T-56 six-speed manual transmission became standard in Chrysler's Viper sportscar and new Ford Mustangs, and international operations were expanded in Japan and China. In 1993, Borg-Warner Automotive Inc. was spun-off from Borg-Warner Security Corporation and became an independent company. In June 1996, BorgWarner acquired three automotive operations (Holley Automotive, Coltec Automotive, and Performance Friction Products) from Coltec Industries Inc. The acquired businesses were manufacturers of a range of products, including air induction systems, throttle bodies, electric air pumps, and oil pumps. In December 1996, BorgWarner sold its North American manual transmission business to Mexico-based Transmisiones y Equipos Mecanicos S.A. de C.V. In 1998, BorgWarner entered the market segment of turbochargers, through the acquisition of Kühnle, Kopp & Kausch AG, a German maker of turbochargers and turbomachinery. Later on, the company was renamed to 3K-Warner Turbosystems GmbH. In March 1999, BorgWarner increased its operations in the turbocharger business with the purchase of Kuhlman Corporation. Kuhlman consisted of three main businesses, two of which were sold off later in 1999. The third unit was Schwitzer, Inc., a maker of heavy-duty steel fuel tanks, fan drives, and turbochargers for diesel engines, which was later on incorporated in 3K-Warner.

=== 2005–2015: Global acquisitions ===
In 2005, BorgWarner's world headquarters was moved from Chicago to the metro Detroit area. Further, between 2006 and 2014, the organization invested in new production facilities, including in South Korea, France, Germany, China, Hungary, Poland, India, Brazil, Portugal, Mexico and Thailand. It also acquired several other companies. This included the 2005 takeover of a majority stake in Beru AG (named after the founders Behr & Ruprecht), a supplier of diesel cold-start technology, sensors, electronics and ignition technology based in Ludwigsburg, Germany.

In 2006, BorgWarner acquired Eaton Corporation’s European transmission and engine controls product lines, a Monaco-based business with expected annual sales of about $57 million.; in 2009, the ignition technology (EcoFlash) from Etatech Inc.; and in 2010, Spanish Dytech Ensa, expanding BorgWarner's operations in exhaust gas recirculation technologies. This was followed by the acquisition of Sweden-based Haldex Traction Systems, known for the Haldex clutch, a multi-plate wet clutch used in four-wheel-drive passenger cars. In 2014, BorgWarner took over German-based Gustav Wahler GmbH & Co. KG, a manufacturer of exhaust gas recirculation valves and pipes as well as coolant control valves, and in 2015, Remy International, Inc., a producer of rotating electrical components, combining it with TorqTransfer Systems and renaming the company to PowerDrive Systems.

=== 2017–present: Conversion to new propulsion technologies ===
In 2017, BorgWarner took over UK-based Sevcon Inc., which produces microprocessor controls for electric vehicles. Further, the company invested in Autotech Ventures, a venture capital fund, to gain access to startups involved in ground transportation. This was followed by a cooperation with Plug and Play as well as Franklin Venture Partners in 2018, representing the second and third Silicon Valley initiative for BorgWarner in the field of mobility and propulsion technologies. Subsequently, in 2019, BorgWarner acquired Rinehart Motion Systems, AM Racing, as well as set up the joint venture Romeo Systems, Inc., expanding existing activities in electric vehicle applications. With the acquisition of Delphi Technologies in 2020, BorgWarner expanded its operations in the field of power electronics, software and calibration capabilities, as well as other products. In 2021, the company acquired five additional companies in the field of electric vehicle services. This included German-based battery manufacturer Akasol in the same year and in 2022, Santroll Automotive Components and Rhombus Energy Solutions. In December 2022, BorgWarner had acquired the Swiss-based company Drivetek AG, a manufacturer of engineering and products for inverters, electric components, and power electronics. In July 2023, BorgWarner spun off its fuel parts and aftermarket segments as part of a plan to focus on its electric vehicle drivetrain business. The newly created standalone company PHINIA, which took over the fuel parts and aftermarket segments, publicly trades on the New York Stock Exchange.

== Business operations ==
BorgWarner Inc., together with its subsidiaries, is a Delaware corporation incorporated in 1987. The company operates manufacturing facilities in Europe, the Americas and Asia and is an original equipment supplier to most major automotive OEM in the world. In 2022, BorgWarner employed around 52,000 people and generated revenues of US$15.8 billion. Frédéric Lissalde has been CEO of BorgWarner Inc. since August 1, 2018. Since the spin-off of its fuel parts and aftermarket segments in 2023 as part of a plan to focus on its electric vehicle drivetrain business, BorgWarner has been operating in the following business segments: air management, e-propulsion and drivetrain.

=== Products ===
The company develops and manufactures products for conventional gas, hybrid and electric vehicles. The company manufactures and sells these products worldwide, primarily to original equipment manufacturers of light vehicles (passenger cars, sport-utility vehicles, vans and light trucks), but also to OEMs of commercial vehicles (medium-duty trucks, heavy-duty trucks and buses), and off-highway vehicles (agricultural and construction machinery and marine applications). BorgWarner has also been supplying its products to tier-one vehicle systems suppliers.

== Social engagement ==
BorgWarner has close links with the Indianapolis 500. In the NTT IndyCar Series, BorgWarner's EFR (Engineered for Racing) turbocharger has been fitted in all participating vehicles in each season since 2012. Since 1936, the company has also appeared as the sponsor of the Borg-Warner Trophy, which serves as an annual prize for the winner of the Indianapolis 500.

In 2017, BorgWarner became an international partner of SOS Children's Villages. This entails flagship projects around the world each year, in which both the company's management and selected employees participate.

== Bibliography ==
Pedersen, Jay P.; Grant, Tina (2000). International directory of company histories (32 ed.). St James Press. ISSN 1557-0126.
