= Lithium titanate =

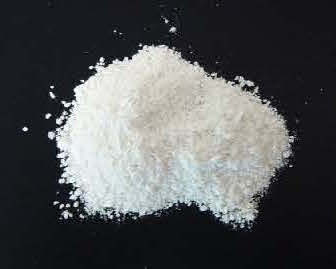

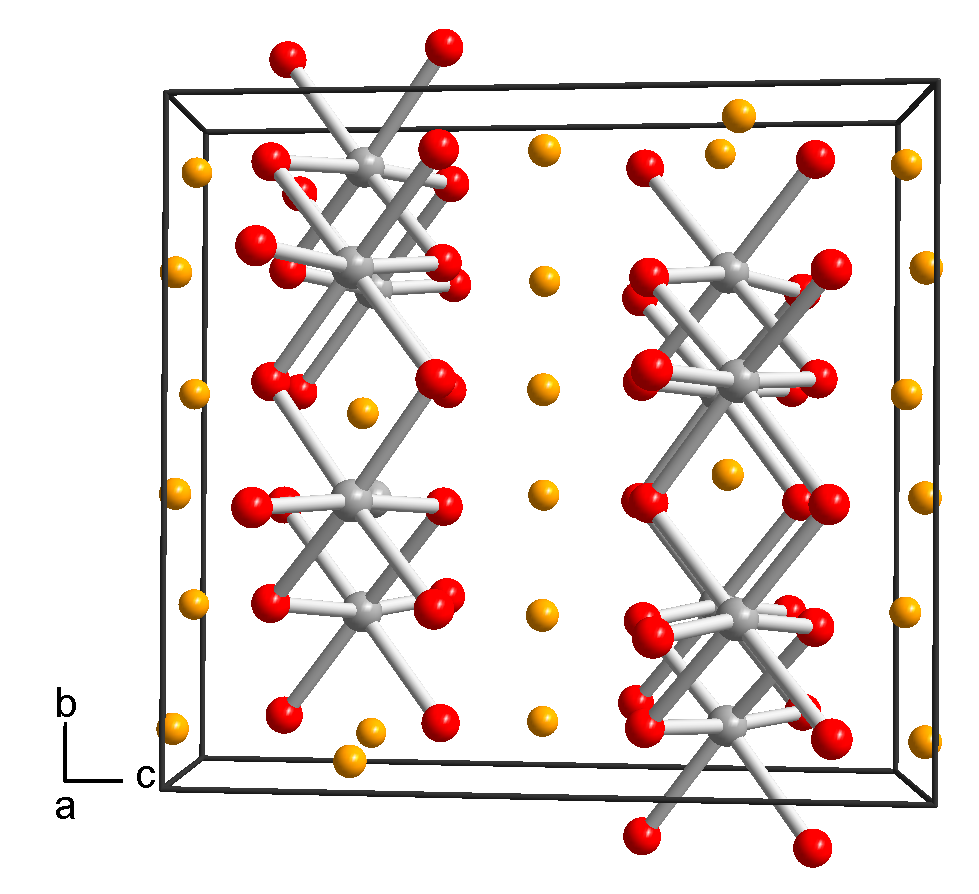
- __Li^{+} __ Ti^{4+} __ O^{2−}

Names
- Other names Lithium metatitanate

Identifiers
CAS Number	12031-82-2
3D model (JSmol)	Interactive image
ChemSpider	141418
ECHA InfoCard	100.031.586
EC Number	234-759-6
PubChem CID	160968
CompTox Dashboard (EPA)	DTXSID20923323
- InChI: InChI=1S/2Li.3O.Ti/q2*+1;3*-2;+4 Key: AXQWGBXVDWYWDE-UHFFFAOYSA-N
- SMILES: [Li+].[Li+].[O-2].[O-2].[O-2].[Ti+4]

Properties
Chemical formula	Li_{2}TiO_{3}
Molar mass	109.76
Appearance	White powder
Density	3.43 g/cm^{3}
Melting point	1,533 °C (2,791 °F; 1,806 K)

Structure
Crystal structure	Monoclinic, mS48, No. 15
Space group	C2/c
Lattice constant	a = 0.505 nm, b = 0.876 nm, c = 0.968 nm α = 90°°, β = 100°°, γ = 90°°
Lattice volume (V)	0.4217 nm^{3}
Formula units (Z)	8
- Except where otherwise noted, data are given for materials in their standard state (at 25 °C [77 °F], 100 kPa). verify (what is ?) Infobox references

Lithium titanates are chemical compounds of lithium, titanium and oxygen. They are mixed oxides and belong to the titanates. The most important lithium titanates are:

- lithium titanate spinel, Li_{4}Ti_{5}O_{12} and the related compounds up to Li_{7}Ti_{5}O_{12}. These titanates are used in lithium-titanate batteries.
- lithium metatitanate, a compound with the chemical formula Li_{2}TiO_{3} and a melting point of 1,533 °C (2,791 °F; 1,806 K) It is a white powder with possible applications in tritium breeding materials in nuclear fusion applications.

Other lithium titanates, i.e. mixed oxides of the system Li_{2}O^{−}TiO_{2}, are:

- Lithium orthotitanate Li_{4}TiO_{4}, melting point of 1,200 °C (2,190 °F; 1,470 K)
- Ramsdellite lithium titanate Li_{2}Ti_{3}O_{7} and Li_{x}TiO_{2} (0 ≦ x ≦ 0.57) with ramsdellite structure.

== Lithium metatitanate ==
Lithium metatitanate is a compound with the chemical formula Li_{2}TiO_{3}. It is a white powder with a melting point of 1,533 °C (2,791 °F). It is also used as an additive in porcelain enamels and ceramic insulating bodies based on titanates. It is frequently utilized as a flux due to its good stability. In recent years, along with other lithium ceramics, metatitanate pebbles have been the subject of research efforts towards tritium breeding materials in nuclear fusion applications.

== Crystallization ==
The most stable lithium titanate phase is β-Li_{2}TiO_{3} that belongs to the monoclinic system. A high-temperature cubic phase exhibiting solid-solution type behavior is referred to as γ-Li_{2}TiO_{3} and is known to form reversibly above temperatures in the range 1150-1250 °C. A metastable cubic phase, isostructural with γ-Li_{2}TiO_{3} is referred to as α-Li_{2}TiO_{3}; it is formed at low temperatures, and transforms to the more stable β-phase upon heating to 400 °C.

== Uses in sintering ==
The sintering process is taking a powder, putting it into a mold and heating it to below its melting point. Sintering is based on atomic diffusion, the atoms in the powder particle diffuse into surrounding particles eventually forming a solid or porous material.

It has been discovered that Li_{2}TiO_{3} powders have a high purity and good sintering ability.

== Uses as a cathode ==
=== Molten carbonate fuel cells ===
Lithium titanate is used as a cathode in layer one of a double layer cathode for molten carbonate fuel cells. These fuel cells have two material layers, layer 1 and layer 2, which allow for the production of high power molten carbonate fuel cells that work more efficiently.

=== Lithium-ion batteries ===
Li_{2}TiO_{3} is used in the cathode of some lithium-ion batteries, along with an aqueous binder and a conducting agent. Li_{2}TiO_{3} is used because it is capable of stabilizing the high capacity cathode conducting agents; LiMO_{2} (M=Fe, Mn, Cr, Ni). Li_{2}TiO_{3} and the conduction agents (LiMO_{2}) are layered in order to create the cathode material. These layers allow for the occurrence of lithium diffusion.

== Lithium-titanate battery ==
The lithium-titanate battery is a rechargeable battery that is much faster to charge than other lithium-ion batteries. It differs from other lithium-ion batteries because it uses lithium-titanate on the anode surface rather than carbon. This is advantageous because it does not create a solid electrolyte interface layer, which acts as a barrier to the ingress and egress of Li-ion to and from the anode. This allows lithium-titanate batteries to be recharged more quickly and provide higher currents when necessary. A disadvantage of the lithium-titanate battery is a much lower capacity and voltage than the conventional lithium-ion battery. The lithium-titanate battery is currently being used in battery electric vehicles and other specialist applications.

== Tritium breeding ==
Fusion reactions, such as those in the proposed ITER thermonuclear demonstrator reactor, are fueled by tritium and deuterium. Tritium resources are extremely limited in their availability, with total resources currently estimated at twenty kilograms. Lithium-containing ceramic pebbles can be used as solid breeder materials in a component known as a helium-cooled breeder blanket for the production of tritium. The breeding blanket constitutes a key component of the ITER reactor design. In such reactor designs tritium is produced by neutrons leaving the plasma and interacting with lithium in the blanket. Li_{2}TiO_{3} along with Li_{4}SiO_{4} are attractive as tritium breeding materials because they exhibit high tritium release, low activation, and chemical stability.

=== Synthesis of lithium-titanate breeder powder ===
Li_{2}TiO_{3} powder is most commonly prepared by the mixing of lithium carbonate, Ti-nitrate solution, and citric acid followed by calcination, compaction, and sintering. The nanocrystalline material created is used as a breeder powder due to its high purity and activity.

== See also ==
- Lithium battery
