= Altairnano =

American electric vehicle manufacturer company

Altair Nanotechnologies, Inc.
- Company type: Private
- Industry: Electronics
- Founded: 1973; 53 years ago
- Headquarters: Reno, Nevada, United States
- Key people: CEO Terry M. Copeland
- Products: Nano-structured lithium batteries Specialty chemicals Nanotechnology
- Net income: ▼US$ 22.28 million (2010)
- Number of employees: 106 (2010)
- Website: www.altairnano.com

Altair Nanotechnologies is an American company specializing in the development and manufacturing of energy storage systems for efficient power and energy management. Altair Nantechnologies designs advanced lithium-ion energy systems and batteries.

== Battery technology ==
Altairnano's best-known product are their lithium-ion batteries, produced by Altair's Power and Energy division. The batteries have an anode made of a lithium titanate oxide formed into a spinel structure. The titanate replaces the graphite anodes of typical lithium-ion batteries. The batteries are not the only batteries to use nanomaterials, but other batteries, like those from A123 Systems generally replace the cathode rather than the anode.
