= History of the lithium-ion battery =

Overview of the events of the development of lithium-ion battery

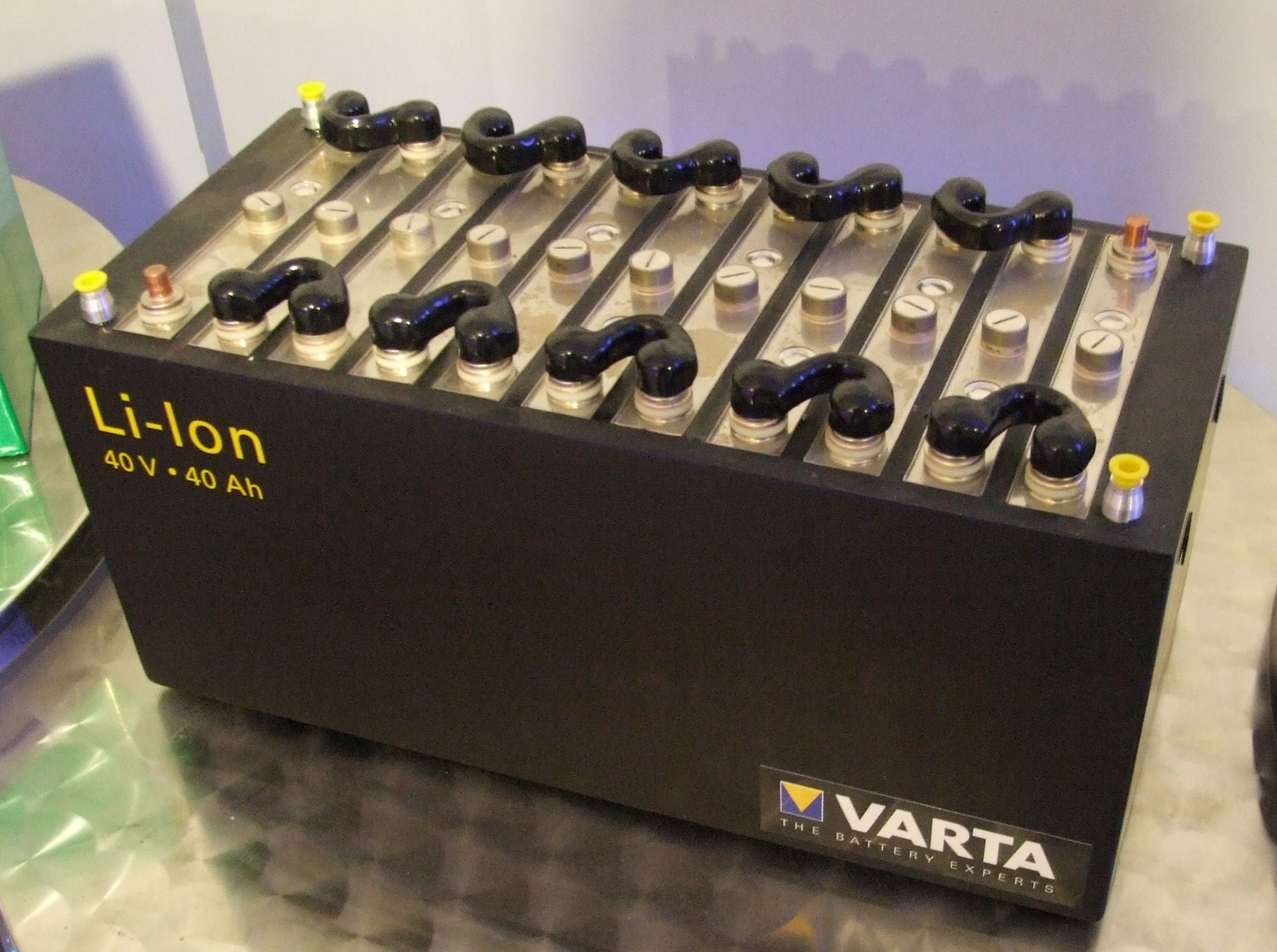
Varta lithium-ion battery, Museum Autovision, Altlussheim, Germany

One of the earliest examples of research into lithium-ion batteries is a CuF_{2}/Li battery developed by NASA in 1965. The breakthrough that produced the earliest form of the modern Li-ion battery was made by British chemist M. Stanley Whittingham in 1974, who first used titanium disulfide (TiS_{2}) as a cathode material, which has a layered structure that can take in lithium ions without significant crystal structure changes. Exxon tried to commercialize this battery in the late 1970s, but found the synthesis expensive and complex, as TiS_{2} is sensitive to moisture and releases toxic hydrogen sulfide (H_{2}S) gas on contact with water. More prohibitively, the batteries were also prone to spontaneously catch fire due to the presence of metallic lithium in the cells. For this, and other reasons, Exxon discontinued the development of Whittingham's lithium-titanium disulfide battery.

In 1980, working in separate groups Ned A. Godshall et al., and, shortly thereafter, Koichi Mizushima and John B. Goodenough, after testing a range of alternative materials, replaced TiS_{2} with lithium cobalt oxide (LiCoO_{2}, or LCO), which has a similar layered structure but offers a higher voltage and much more stability in air. This material would later be used in the first commercial Li-ion battery, although it did not, on its own, resolve the persistent issue of flammability.

These early attempts to develop rechargeable Li-ion batteries used lithium metal anodes, which were ultimately abandoned due to safety concerns, as lithium metal is unstable and prone to dendrite formation, which can cause short-circuiting. The eventual solution was to use an intercalation anode, similar to that used for the cathode, which prevents the formation of lithium metal during battery charging. The first to demonstrate lithium ion reversible intercalation into graphite anodes was Jürgen Otto Besenhard in 1974. Besenhard used organic solvents such as carbonates for an electrolyte, however these solvents decomposed rapidly providing short battery cycle life. Later, in 1980, Rachid Yazami used a solid organic electrolyte, polyethylene oxide, which was more stable.

In 1985, Akira Yoshino at Asahi Kasei Corporation discovered that petroleum coke, a less graphitized form of carbon, can reversibly intercalate Li-ions at a low potential of ~0.5 V relative to Li+ /Li without structural degradation. Its structural stability originates from its amorphous carbon regions, which serve as covalent joints to pin the layers together. Although it has a lower specific capacity compared to graphite (~Li0.5C6, 186 mAh g–1), it became the first commercial intercalation anode for Li-ion batteries owing to its cycling stability. In 1987, Yoshino patented what would become the first commercial lithium-ion battery using this anode. He used Goodenough's previously reported LiCoO_{2} as the cathode and a carbonate ester-based electrolyte. The battery was assembled in the discharged state, which made it safer and cheaper to manufacture. In 1991, using Yoshino's design, Sony began producing and selling the world's first rechargeable lithium-ion batteries. The following year, a joint venture between Toshiba and Asahi Kasei Co. also released a lithium-ion battery. Significant improvements in energy density were achieved in the 1990s by replacing Yoshino's soft carbon anode first with hard carbon and later with graphite.

In 1990, Jeff Dahn and two colleagues at Dalhousie University (Canada) reported reversible intercalation of lithium ions into graphite in the presence of ethylene carbonate solvent (which is solid at room temperature and is mixed with other solvents to make a liquid). This represented the final innovation of the era that created the basic design of the modern lithium-ion battery.

In 2010, global lithium-ion battery production capacity was 20 gigawatt-hours. By 2016, it was 28 GWh, with 16.4 GWh in China. Global production capacity was 767 GWh in 2020, with China accounting for 75%. Production in 2021 is estimated by various sources to be between 200 and 600 GWh, and predictions for 2023 range from 400 to 1,100 GWh.

In 2012, John B. Goodenough, Rachid Yazami and Akira Yoshino received the 2012 IEEE Medal for Environmental and Safety Technologies for developing the lithium-ion battery; Goodenough, Whittingham, and Yoshino were awarded the 2019 Nobel Prize in Chemistry "for the development of lithium-ion batteries". Jeff Dahn received the ECS Battery Division Technology Award (2011) and the Yeager award from the International Battery Materials Association (2016).

== Before lithium-ion: 1960-1975 ==
- 1960s: Much of the basic research that led to the development of the intercalation compounds that form the core of lithium-ion batteries was carried out in the 1960s by Robert Huggins and Carl Wagner, who studied the movement of ions in solids. In a 1967 report by the US military, plastic polymers were already used as binders for electrodes and graphite as a constituent for both cathodes and anodes, mostly for cathodes.
- 1970s: Reversible intercalation of lithium ions into graphite as anodes and intercalation of lithium ions into cathodic oxide as cathodes was discovered during 1974–76 by Jürgen Otto Besenhard at the Technical University of Munich. Besenhard proposed its application in lithium cells. What was missing from Besenhard's batteries was a solvent that avoided co-intercalation into graphite, electrolyte decomposition and corrosion of current collectors. Thus, his batteries had very short cycle lives.
- 1970s: Reversible intercalation of lithium ions into layered cathode materials. British chemist, M. Stanley Whittingham, then a researcher at ExxonMobil, first reported charge-discharge cycling with a lithium metal battery (a precursor to modern lithium-ion batteries) in the 1970s. Drawing on previous research from his time at Stanford University, he used a layered titanium(IV) sulfide as cathode and lithium metal as anode. However, this setup proved impractical. Titanium disulfide was expensive (~$1,000 per kilogram in the 1970s) and difficult to work with, since it has to be synthesized under completely oxygen- and moisture-free conditions. When exposed to air, it reacts to form hydrogen sulfide compounds, which have an unpleasant odour and are toxic to humans and most animals. For this, and other reasons, Exxon discontinued development of Whittingham's lithium-titanium disulfide battery.

Batteries with metallic lithium electrodes presented safety issues, most importantly the formation of lithium dendrites, that internally short-circuit the battery resulting in explosions. Also, dendrites often lose electronic contact with current collectors leading to a loss of cyclable Li+ charge. Consequently, research moved to develop batteries in which, instead of metallic lithium, only lithium compounds are present, being capable of accepting and releasing lithium ions.

- 1973: Adam Heller proposed the lithium thionyl chloride battery, still used in implanted medical devices and in defense systems where a greater than 20-year shelf life, high energy density, and/or tolerance for extreme operating temperatures are required. However, this battery employs unsafe lithium metal and was not rechargeable.

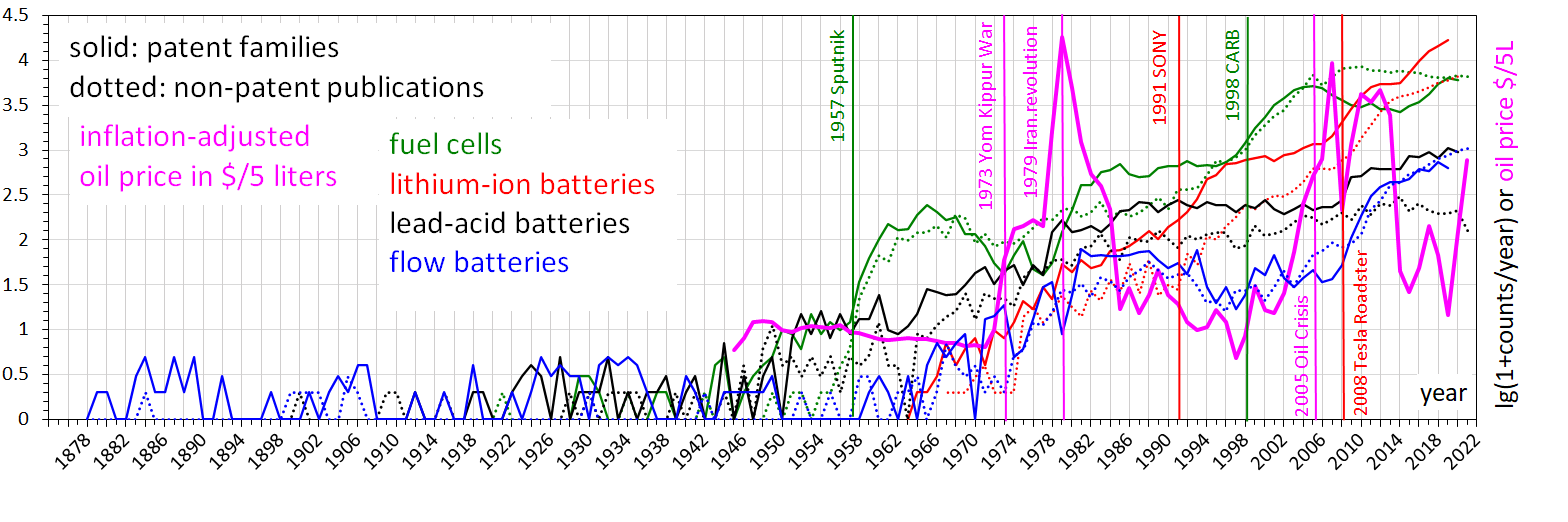
The log number of publications about electrochemical powersources by year. lithium-ion batteries are shown in red. The magenta line is the inflation-adjusted oil price in US$/liter in linear scale.

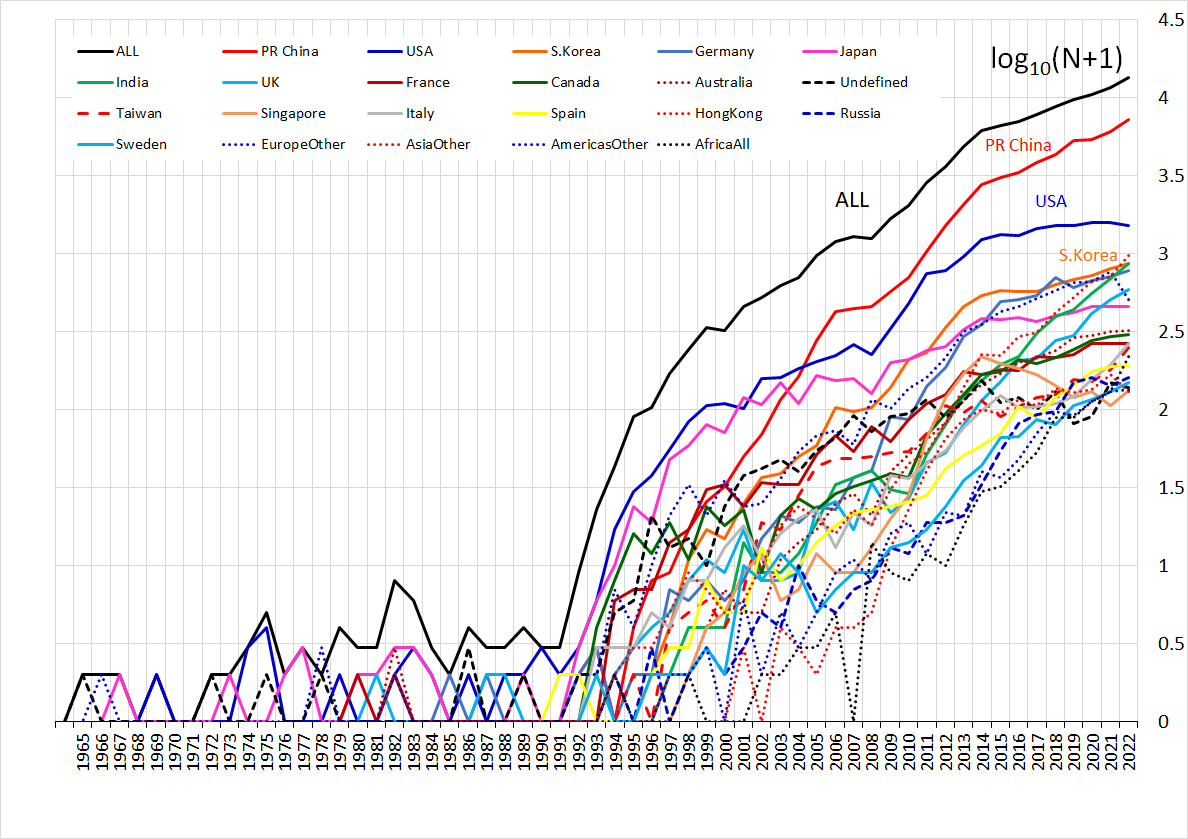
The number of non-patent publications about lithium-ion batteries grouped by authors' country vs. publication year

== Precommercial development: 1974-1990 ==
- 1974: Besenhard was the first to show reversibility of Li-ion intercalation into graphite anodes, using organic solvents, including carbonate solvents.
- 1976: Stanley Whittingham and his colleagues at Exxon demonstrated what can be considered the first rechargeable "lithium-ion battery", although not a single component in this design was used in commercial lithium-ion batteries later. Whittingham's cell was assembled in a charged state using lithium aluminum alloy as the negative electrode, LiBPh_{4} (lithium tetraphenylborate) in dioxolane as the electrolyte and TiS_{2} as the positive electrode. The battery's useful cycle life was no more than 50 cycles. This design was based on Whittingham's earlier Li-metal batteries.
- 1977: Samar Basu et al. demonstrated irreversible intercalation of lithium in graphite at the University of Pennsylvania. This led to the development of a workable lithium-intercalated graphite electrode at Bell Labs in 1984 (LiC_{6}) as an alternative to the lithium-metal electrode battery. However, it was a molten-salt cell rather than a lithium-ion battery.
- 1978: Michel Armand introduced the term and a concept of a rocking-chair battery, where the same type of ion is de/intercalated into both positive and negative electrode during dis/charge. In the rocking-chair design solution-phase species do not appear in the reaction stoichiometry, which allows for minimizing the amount of solvent in the battery, reduces the battery weight and cost.
- 1979: Working in separate groups, Ned A. Godshall et al., and, shortly thereafter, John B. Goodenough (Oxford University) and Koichi Mizushima (Tokyo University), demonstrated limited discharge-charge cycling of a 4 V cell made with lithium cobalt dioxide (LiCoO_{2}) as the positive electrode and lithium metal as the negative electrode. This innovation provided the positive electrode material, which eventually became a component in the first commercial rechargeable lithium-ion battery. LiCoO_{2} is a stable positive electrode material which acts as a donor of lithium ions, which means that it can be used with a negative electrode material other than lithium metal. By enabling the use of stable and easy-to-handle negative electrode materials, LiCoO_{2} enabled novel rechargeable battery systems. Godshall et al. further identified the similar value of ternary compound lithium-transition metal-oxides such as the spinel LiMn_{2}O_{4}, Li_{2}MnO_{3}, LiMnO_{2}, LiFeO_{2}, LiFe_{5}O_{8}, and LiFe_{5}O_{4} (and later lithium-copper-oxide and lithium-nickel-oxide cathode materials in 1985) Godshall et al. patent U.S. patent 4,340,652 for the use of LiCoO_{2} as cathodes in lithium batteries was based on Godshall's Stanford University Ph.D. dissertation and 1979 publications.
- 1980: M. Lazzari and Bruno Scrosati at the University of Rome validated the concept of rocking-chair battery using lithium tungsten dioxide as the anode, titanium disulfide as the cathode and lithium perchlorate in propylene carbonate as the electrolyte.
- 1980's: The negative electrode has its origins in PAS (polyacenic / polyacetylene semiconductive material) discovered by Tokio Yamabe and later by Shizukuni Yata in the early 1980s. This development was inspired by an earlier discovery of conductive polymers by Professor Hideki Shirakawa and his group, and it could also be seen as having started from the polyacetylene lithium-ion battery developed by Alan MacDiarmid and Alan J. Heeger et al.
- 1983: Rachid Yazami demonstrated the reversible electrochemical intercalation of lithium in graphite at room temperature using polyethylene oxide solvent. The organic battery solvents, known at the time, decompose during charging with a graphite negative electrode. For this reason, Yazami used a solid electrolyte to demonstrate that lithium could be reversibly intercalated into graphite via an electrochemical mechanism at room temperature.
- 1983: Michael M. Thackeray, Peter Bruce, William David, and John B. Goodenough developed manganese spinel, Mn_{2}O_{4}, as a charged cathode material for lithium-ion batteries. It has two flat plateaus on discharge, with lithium one at 4 V, stoichiometry LiMn_{2}O_{4}, and one at 3 V with a final stoichiometry of Li_{2}Mn_{2}O_{4}.
- 1985: Akira Yoshino demonstrated a rechargeable Li-ion battery using carbonaceous material (acetylene black), into which lithium ions could be inserted, as the negative electrode (anode) and lithium cobalt oxide (LiCoO_{2}) as the positive electrode (cathode). This dramatically improved safety LiCoO_{2} and prepared Sony for commercial launch of a rechargeable lithium-ion battery 5 years later. Yoshino's design in 1985 was different from the final (1990) design in using 0.6 mol of LiClO_{4} (rather than LiPF_{6}) in propylene carbonate (without ethylene or linear carbonate used currently to passivate the graphite negative electrode) and in using polyacrylonitrile rather than polyvinylidene difluoride as the binder.
- 1986 : Around the same time as Akira Yoshino, Auborn and Barberio at Bell Laboratory independently demonstrated another true rocking-chair battery assembled in the fully discharged state. Their 1.8 V lithium-ion battery comprised LiCoO_{2} as the positive electrode, 1M LiPF_{6} in propylene carbonate as the electrolyte and MoO_{2} as the negative electrode.
- 1986 : Asahi researchers, led by Akira Yoshino, demonstrated rechargeable battery with lithium tetrafluoroborate (LiBF_{4}) dissolved in a mixture of PC, gamma-butyrolactone (γBL) and ethylene carbonate (EC), as the electrolyte. The fluorinated anion turned out to be effective in passivating the Al current collector and compatible with the solvents, while ethylene carbonate (which is solid at room temperature and is mixed with other solvents to make a liquid) provided the necessary solid electrolyte interphase on the anode, thus publicly disclosing the final piece of the puzzle leading to the modern lithium-ion battery. This design was practically identical (except for LiBF_{4} being replaced with LiPF_{6}, which is less reactive with the solvent(s)) to the one used in commercial lithium-ion batteries today.
- 1987-1989: Arumugam Manthiram and John B. Goodenough discovered the polyanion class of cathodes. They showed that positive electrodes containing polyanions, e.g., sulfates, produce higher voltages than oxides due to the inductive effect of the polyanion. This polyanion class contains materials such as lithium iron phosphate.
- 1989: The recall of Moli Energy cells, comprising lithium metal, abruptly changed researchers’ perception in favor of heavier but safer dual-intercalation (i.e. lithium-ion rather than lithium-metal) batteries.
- 1989-10-11: Jeff Dahn and two colleagues at Moli Energy in Burnaby (Canada) submit a journal article, proving a reversible intercalation of lithium ions into graphite in the presence of ethylene carbonate solvent (in 50:50 mixture with propylene carbonate and with 1M LiAsF_{6} salt), and demonstrating the formation of solid electrolyte intephase on the first charge, followed by a reversible battery cycling. This is essentially the composition, which will be used in commercial Li-ion batteries since 1992, except for LiAsF6 having been replaced with cheaper and less toxic LiPF_{6}.
- 1990: Rachid Yazami at the French National Centre for Scientific Research in Grenoble, France starts collaborating with Sony on developing graphite anode and liquid electrolyte for lithium-ion batteries, eventually discovering the magic ethylene carbonate solvent, which resulted in almost doubling (to 155 Wh/kg) the specific energy of cells with soft carbon anodes.
- 1990-12-10: Sanyo Electric of Japan files a patent application, that describes a rechargeable (ca. 250 cycles) lithium metal battery with a mixed ethylene carbonate + dimethyl carbonate solvent and LiPF_{6} as the electrolyte.
- 1990: The English term "lithium-ion battery", which was invented as a marketing tool to distinguish the new technology from ill-fated lithium metal batteries appeared for the first time in a publication. It was used by Sony employees.
- In 2017 (2 years before the 2019 Nobel Prize in Chemistry was awarded) George Blomgren offered some speculations on why Akira Yoshino's group produced a commercially viable lithium-ion battery before Jeff Dahn's group:
  - The Dahn group tested the carbonaceous positive electrode against lithium instead of a metal oxide. Therefore, they did not observe the severe corrosion of an aluminum positive current collector with the LiAsF_{6} electrolyte, but Yoshino et al. used ... LiPF_{6}, which was commonly used for primary lithium metal batteries in Japan.
  - Yoshino et al. also studied various binders including the ultimate winner- polyvinylidene fluoride, while Dahn's group used only ethylene propylene diene monomer (EPDM), which turned out to be not durable enough for commercial LIBs.

== Commercialization in portable applications: 1991-2006 ==
The performance and capacity of lithium-ion batteries increased as development progressed.

- 1991: Sony and Asahi Kasei started commercial sale of the first rechargeable lithium-ion battery. The Japanese team that successfully commercialized the technology was led by Yoshio Nishi. 1991 ushered the Second Period (commercialization) in the history of lithium-ion batteries, which is reflected as inflection points in the plots "The log number of publications about electrochemical powersources by year" and "The number of non-patent publications about lithium-ion batteries" shown on this page. The battery employed soft carbon (rather than graphite) anode and LiCoO_{2} cathode. Sony's success with the development of lithium-ion battery manufacturing benefited from the company's prior experience with manufacturing monodisperse (20 μm) metal oxide microparticles and with coating processes for magnetic tapes.
- 1994: iconectiv First commercialization of Li polymer by Bellcore.
- 1994: The first aqueous Li-ion “rocking chair” chemistry was demonstrated by Dahn et al. It had a VO_{2} anode and LiMn_{2}O_{4} cathode in a 5 M LiNO_{3} electrolyte with 1 mM LiOH.
- 1996: Goodenough, Akshaya Padhi and coworkers proposed lithium iron phosphate (LiFePO_{4}) and other phospho-olivines (lithium metal phosphates with the same structure as mineral olivine) as positive electrode materials.
- 1996: Sony and Nissan announced a partnership to develop a lithium-ion battery powered car FEV II with a 124-mile driving range.
- 1998: C. S. Johnson, J. T. Vaughey, M. M. Thackeray, T. E. Bofinger, and S. A. Hackney report the discovery of the high capacity high voltage lithium-rich NMC cathode materials.
- 2001: Arumugam Manthiram and co-workers discovered that the capacity limitations of layered oxide cathodes is a result of chemical instability that can be understood based on the relative positions of the metal 3d band relative to the top of the oxygen 2p band. This discovery has had significant implications for the practically accessible compositional space of lithium-ion battery layered oxide cathodes, as well as their stability from a safety perspective.
- 2001: Christopher Johnson, Michael Thackeray, Khalil Amine, and Jaekook Kim file a patent for lithium nickel manganese cobalt oxide (NMC) lithium rich cathodes based on a domain structure.
- 2001: Zhonghua Lu and Jeff Dahn file a patent for the NMC class of positive electrode materials, which offers safety and energy density improvements over the widely used lithium cobalt oxide.
- 2002: Yet-Ming Chiang and his group at MIT showed a substantial improvement in the performance of lithium batteries by boosting the LiFePO_{4} material's conductivity by doping it with aluminium, niobium and zirconium. The exact mechanism causing the increase became the subject of widespread debate.
- 2004: Yet-Ming Chiang again increased performance by utilizing lithium iron phosphate particles of less than 100 nanometers in diameter. This decreased particle density almost one hundredfold, increased the positive electrode's surface area and improved capacity and performance. Commercialization led to a rapid growth in the market for higher capacity lithium-ion batteries, as well as a patent infringement battle between Chiang and John Goodenough.
- 2004: The number of non-patent publications about lithium-ion batteries from PR China surpassed that from the US. Japan was the third leading country till 2011, when it was surpassed by South Korea.
- 2005: Y Song, PY Zavalij, and M. Stanley Whittingham report a new two-electron vanadium phosphate cathode material with high energy density

== Commercialization in automotive applications: 2006-today ==
- 2006 July (prototype): 6,831 cells; used in the Tesla Roadster
- 2011: Lithium nickel manganese cobalt oxide (NMC) cathodes, developed at Argonne National Laboratory, are manufactured commercially by BASF in Ohio.
- 2011: Lithium-ion batteries accounted for 66% of all portable secondary (i.e., rechargeable) battery sales in Japan.
- 2012: John Goodenough, Rachid Yazami and Akira Yoshino received the 2012 IEEE Medal for Environmental and Safety Technologies for developing the lithium-ion battery.
- 2014: John Goodenough, Yoshio Nishi, Rachid Yazami and Akira Yoshino were awarded the Charles Stark Draper Prize of the National Academy of Engineering for their pioneering efforts in the field.
- 2014: Commercial batteries from Amprius Corp. reached 650 Wh/L (a 20% increase), using a silicon anode and were delivered to customers.
- 2016: Koichi Mizushima and Akira Yoshino received the NIMS Award from the National Institute for Materials Science, for Mizushima's discovery of the LiCoO_{2} cathode material for the lithium-ion battery and Yoshino's development of the lithium-ion battery.
- 2016: Z. Qi, and Gary Koenig reported a scalable method to produce sub-micrometer sized LiCoO_{2} using a template-based approach.
- 2019: The Nobel Prize in Chemistry was awarded to John Goodenough, Stanley Whittingham and Akira Yoshino "for the development of lithium ion batteries".
- 2022: Battery startup SPARKZ announced plans to convert a glass plant in Bridgeport, WV to produce zero-cobalt lithium batteries.

== Market ==
Price per kilowatt-hour of lithium-ion batteries declined from $9,200 in 1991 to $78 in 2024.

On average, the price of lithium-ion batteries declined about 19% for each doubling of installed capacity—the technology's "learning rate".

Industry produced about 660 million cylindrical lithium-ion cells in 2012; the 18650 size is by far the most popular for cylindrical cells. If Tesla were to have met its goal of shipping 40,000 Model S electric cars in 2014 and if the 85 kWh battery, which uses 7,104 of these cells, had proved as popular overseas as it was in the United States, a 2014 study projected that the Model S alone would use almost 40 percent of estimated global cylindrical battery production during 2014. As of 2013, production was gradually shifting to higher-capacity 3,000+ mAh cells. Annual flat polymer cell demand was expected to exceed 700 million in 2013.

Prices of lithium-ion batteries have fallen over time. Overall, between 1991 and 2018, prices for all types of lithium-ion cells (in dollars per kWh) fell approximately 97%. Over the same time period, energy density more than tripled. Efforts to increase energy density contributed significantly to cost reduction.

In 2015, cost estimates ranged from $300–500/kWh. In 2016 GM revealed they would be paying US$145/kWh for the batteries in the Chevy Bolt EV. In 2017, the average residential energy storage systems installation cost was expected to drop from $1600 /kWh in 2015 to $250 /kWh by 2040 and to see the price with 70% reduction by 2030. In 2019, some electric vehicle battery pack costs were estimated at $150–200, and VW noted it was paying US$100/kWh for its next generation of electric vehicles.

Batteries are used for grid energy storage and ancillary services. For a Li-ion storage coupled with photovoltaics and an anaerobic digestion biogas power plant, Li-ion will generate a higher profit if it is cycled more frequently (hence a higher lifetime electricity output) although the lifetime is reduced due to degradation.

Several types of lithium nickel cobalt manganese oxide (NCM) and lithium nickel cobalt aluminium oxide (NCA) cathode powders with a layered structure are commercially available. Their chemical compositions are specified by the molar ratio of component metals. NCM 111 (or NCM 333) have equimolar parts of nickel, cobalt and manganese. Notably, in NCM cathodes, manganese is not electroactive and remains in the oxidation state +4 during battery's charge-discharge cycling. Cobalt is cycled between the oxidation states +3 and +4, and nickel - between +2 and +4. Due to the higher price of cobalt and due to the higher number of cyclable electrons per nickel atom, high-nickel (also known as "nickel-rich") materials (with Ni atomic percentage > 50%) gain considerable attention from both battery researchers and battery manufacturers. However, high-Ni cathodes are prone to O_{2} evolution and Li^{+}/Ni^{4+} cation mixing upon overcharging.

As of 2019, NMC 532 and NMC 622 were the preferred low-cobalt types for electric vehicles, with NMC 811 and even lower cobalt ratios seeing increasing use, mitigating cobalt dependency. However, cobalt for electric vehicles increased 81% from the first half of 2018 to 7,200 tonnes in the first half of 2019, for a battery capacity of 46.3 GWh.

In 2010, global lithium-ion battery production capacity was 20 gigawatt-hours. By 2016, it was 28 GWh, with 16.4 GWh in China. Production in 2021 is estimated by various sources to be between 200 and 600 GWh, and predictions for 2023 range from 400 to 1,100 GWh.

An antitrust-violating price-fixing cartel among nine corporate families, including LG Chem, GS Yuasa, Hitachi Maxell, NEC, Panasonic/Sanyo, Samsung, Sony, and Toshiba was found to be rigging battery prices and restricting output between 2000 and 2011.
