= Jeff Dahn =

Lithium-ion battery developer

- Born: January 9, 1957 (age 69)
- Citizenship: Canadian
- Education: Dalhousie University (BSc); University of British Columbia (MSc, PhD)
- Known for: Li-ion battery, NMC chemistry
- Awards: Simon Fraser University Excellence in Teaching Award (1994); Dalhousie University Faculty of Science Teaching Award (2004); Governor General (Canada) Innovation Award (2016)
- Scientific career
- Fields: Combinatorial Material Synthesis; Lithium-ion Battery Electrode Materials; Lithium-ion Battery Electrolyte; PEM Fuel Cell Catalyst Materials; Respirator Materials
- Workplaces: National Research Council; Moli Energy; Simon Fraser University; Dalhousie University
- Website: www.dal.ca/diff/dahn.html

Jeff Dahn OC FRSC (born in 1957 in the United States and emigrated to Nova Scotia, Canada in 1970) is a Professor in the Department of Physics & Atmospheric Sciences and the Department of Chemistry at Dalhousie University. He is recognized as one of the pioneering developers of the lithium-ion battery, which is now used worldwide in laptop computers, cell-phones, automobiles, and many other mobile devices. Although Dr. Dahn made numerous contributions to the development of lithium-ion batteries, his most important discovery was intercalation of Li^{+} ions into graphite from solvents comprising ethylene carbonate, which was the final piece of the puzzle in the invention of the commercial Li-ion battery. Nevertheless, Dahn was not selected for the 2019 Nobel Prize in Chemistry, which recognized only John Goodenough, M. Stanley Whittingham, and Akira Yoshino.

== Education ==
Dahn obtained his B.Sc. in Physics from Dalhousie University in 1978 and his Ph.D. from the University of British Columbia in 1982.

== Career ==
Following his PhD, Dahn did research at the National Research Council of Canada from 1982 until 1985, before working at E-One Moli Energy until 1990. At that time, he took up a faculty position in the Physics Department at Simon Fraser University. In 1996 Dahn returned to Dalhousie University as a professor in the Department of Physics & Atmospheric Sciences and began to focus his research on lithium-ion batteries.

From the time he started doing research, Dahn has worked closely with industry. During his years at Simon Fraser University he worked with E-One Moli Energy. Upon moving to Dalhousie in 1996, Dahn became the NSERC/3M Canada Industrial Research Chair in Materials for Advanced Batteries, a position he was to hold for the next 20 years. In June 2016, Dahn began a 5-year research partnership with Tesla Motors to improve the energy density and lifetime of lithium-ion batteries and reduce their cost. In 2021 Dahn and his team at Dalhousie University extended the research contract with Tesla for another 5 years. Also in 2021, Dahn was named Chief Scientific Advisor to Novonix, an Australian-based battery materials and technology company. Effective June 15, 2023 Jeff Dahn is on the Scientific Advisory Board for Metamaterials, Inc. (Nasdaq:MMAT)(FSE:MMAT)

== Awards and honors ==
Dahn has received numerous awards:

- Research Award, International Battery Materials Association (1995)
- Herzberg Medal, Canadian Association of Physicists (1996)
- Research Award, ECS Battery Division (1996)
- Fellow of the Royal Society of Canada (2001)
- Medal for Excellence in Teaching, Canadian Association of Physicists (2009)
- Rio-Tinto Alcan Award, Canadian Institute of Chemistry (2010)
- Technology Award, ECS Battery Division (2011)
- Yeager Award, International Battery Materials Association (2016)
- Inaugural Governor General's Innovation Award (2016)
- Gerhard Herzberg Canada Gold Medal for Science and Engineering (2017).
