= John B. Goodenough bibliography =

List of works by John B. Goodenough

This is an incomplete list of works by John B. Goodenough. His academic output has been described as "prolific".

== Cation interactions ==
- Goodenough, John B. (1960). "Direct cation-cation interactions in primarily ionic solids". Journal of Applied Physics. 31 (5): S359 – S61. Bibcode:1960JAP....31S.359G. doi:10.1063/1.1984748.
- — (1960). "Direct cation-cation interactions in several oxides". Physical Review. 117 (6): 1442–51. Bibcode:1960PhRv..117.1442G. doi:10.1103/PhysRev.117.1442.
- — (1962). "Cation-cation three-membered ring formation". Journal of Applied Physics. 33 (3): 1197–9. Bibcode:1962JAP....33.1197G. doi:10.1063/1.1728656.
- — (1963). "Atomic moments and magnetic coupling in cation excess-nickel arsenides". Journal of Applied Physics. 34 (4): 1193–4. Bibcode:1963JAP....34.1193G. doi:10.1063/1.1729430.

== Crystallography ==
- — (1953). "A theory of the deviation from close packing in hexagonal metal crystals". Physical Review. 89 (1): 282–94. Bibcode:1953PhRv...89..282G. doi:10.1103/PhysRev.89.282.
- —; et al. (1955). "Theory of ionic ordering, crystal distortion, and magnetic exchange due to covalent forces in spinels". Physical Review. 98 (2): 391–408. Bibcode:1955PhRv...98..391G. doi:10.1103/PhysRev.98.391.
- — (1958). "An interpretation of the magnetic properties of the perovskite-type mixed crystals La_{1-x}Sr_{x}CoO_{3−λ}". J Phys Chem Solids. 6 (2–3): 287–97. Bibcode:1958JPCS....6..287G. doi:10.1016/0022-3697(58)90107-0.
- —; et al. (1958). "Some magnetic and crystallographic properties of the system LaMn_{1−x}Ni_{x}O_{3+λ}". Journal of Applied Physics. 29 (3): 387–9. Bibcode:1958JAP....29..387W. doi:10.1063/1.1723147.
- —; et al. (1960). "Interpretation of the Magnetic and Crystallographic Properties of Several Iron, Nickel, and Iron-Nickel Nitrides". Journal of Applied Physics. 31 (5): S342 – S3. Bibcode:1960JAP....31S.342G. doi:10.1063/1.1984739.
- —; et al. (1961). "Relationship between crystal symmetry and magnetic properties of ionic compounds containing Mn^{3+}". Physical Review. 124 (2): 373–84. Bibcode:1961PhRv..124..373G. doi:10.1103/PhysRev.124.373.
- —; et al. (1963). "Crystallographic transitions in several chromium spinel systems". Journal of Applied Physics. 34 (4): 1085–6. Bibcode:1963JAP....34.1085W. doi:10.1063/1.1729380.
- — (1967). "Characterization of d electrons in solids by structure. II. Spontaneous crystallographic distortions". Mater Res Bull. 2 (2): 165–84. doi:10.1016/0025-5408(67)90056-6.
- — (1971). "The two components of the crystallographic transition in VO_{2}". J Solid State Chem. 3 (4): 490–500. Bibcode:1971JSSCh...3..490G. doi:10.1016/0022-4596(71)90091-0.
- —; et al. (1973). "Crystal chemistry and magnetic properties of Cr^{II}B^{III}F_{5} compounds". Mater Res Bull. 8 (12): 1467–77. doi:10.1016/0025-5408(73)90032-9.
- —; et al. (1974). "Crystal chemistry in the system MSbO_{3}". J Solid State Chem. 9 (4): 345–51. Bibcode:1974JSSCh...9..345H. doi:10.1016/0022-4596(74)90093-0.
- —; et al. (1974). "Crystallography, magnetism, and band structure of Mn_{5}Ni_{2}Bi_{4}-type compounds". Phys Rev B. 10 (1): 120–7. Bibcode:1974PhRvB..10..120S. doi:10.1103/PhysRevB.10.120.

== Electricity ==
- — (1964). "Spin correlations among narrow-band electrons". Journal of Applied Physics. 35 (3): 1083–4. Bibcode:1964JAP....35.1083G. doi:10.1063/1.1713388.
- —; et al. (1965). "The relation of the electrical conductivity in single crystals of rhenium trioxide to the conductivities of Sr_{2}MgReO_{6} and Na_{x}WO_{3}". J Phys Chem Solids. 26 (12): 2007–11. Bibcode:1965JPCS...26.2007F. doi:10.1016/0022-3697(65)90237-4.
- — (1966). "Covalency criterion for localized vs collective electrons in oxides with the perovskite structure". Journal of Applied Physics. 37 (3): 1415–22. Bibcode:1966JAP....37.1415G. doi:10.1063/1.1708496.
- — (1967). "Narrow-band electrons in transition-metal oxides". Czech J Phys. 17 (4): 304–36. Bibcode:1967CzJPh..17..304G. doi:10.1007/BF01691621.
- — (1967). "Characterization of d electrons in solids by structure I. Localized vs collective electrons". Mater Res Bull. 2 (1): 37–48. doi:10.1016/0025-5408(67)90041-4.
- —; et al. (1967). "First-order localized-electron collective-electron transition in LaCoO_{3}". Physical Review. 155 (3): 932–43. Bibcode:1967PhRv..155..932R. doi:10.1103/PhysRev.155.932.
- —; et al. (1967). "The electrical properties and band structure of doped LaInO_{3}". Mater Res Bull. 2 (2): 223–30. doi:10.1016/0025-5408(67)90061-X.
- — (1968). "Spin-orbit-coupling effects in transition-metal compounds". Physical Review. 171 (2): 466–79. Bibcode:1968PhRv..171..466G. doi:10.1103/PhysRev.171.466.
- — (1968). "Localized vs collective descriptions of magnetic electrons". Journal of Applied Physics. 39 (2): 403–11. Bibcode:1968JAP....39..403G. doi:10.1063/1.2163457.
- — (1968). "A Localized-electron to collective-electron transition in the system (La, Sr)CoO_{3}". Journal of Applied Physics. 39 (2): 1209–10. Bibcode:1968JAP....39.1209R. doi:10.1063/1.1656227.
- — (1969). "Descriptions of outer d electrons in thiospinels". J Phys Chem Solids. 30 (2): 261–80. Bibcode:1969JPCS...30..261G. doi:10.1016/0022-3697(69)90308-4.
- — (1971). "Coexistence of localized and itinerant d electrons". Mater Res Bull. 6 (10): 967–76. doi:10.1016/0025-5408(71)90075-4.
- — (1972). "Energy bands in TX_{2} compounds with pyrite, marcasite, and arsenopyrite structures". J Solid State Chem. 5 (1): 144–52. Bibcode:1972JSSCh...5..144G. doi:10.1016/0022-4596(72)90022-9.
- —; et al. (1974). "Propriétés electriques et magnétiques des solutions solides La_{x}Eu_{1-x}B_{6}". J Solid State Chem. 9 (1): 37–47. Bibcode:1974JSSCh...9...37M. doi:10.1016/0022-4596(74)90052-8.
- —; et al. (1975). "Etude des proprietes magnetiques, electriques et optiques des phases de structure perovskite SrVO_{2.90} et SrVO_{3}". J Solid State Chem. 14 (3): 247–59. Bibcode:1975JSSCh..14..247D. doi:10.1016/0022-4596(75)90029-8.

== Ferrites ==
- — (1956). "Interpretation of domain patterns recently found in BiMn and SiFe alloys". Physical Review. 102 (2): 356–65. Bibcode:1956PhRv..102..356G. doi:10.1103/PhysRev.102.356.

== Magnetism ==
- — (1958). "An interpretation of the magnetic properties of the perovskite-type mixed crystals La_{1-x}Sr_{x}CoO_{3−λ}". J Phys Chem Solids. 6 (2–3): 287–97. Bibcode:1958JPCS....6..287G. doi:10.1016/0022-3697(58)90107-0.
- —; et al. (1958). "Some magnetic and crystallographic properties of the system Li^{+}_{x}Ni^{++}_{1-2x}ni^{+++}_{x}O". J Phys Chem Solids. 5 (1–2): 107–16. Bibcode:1958JPCS....5..107G. doi:10.1016/0022-3697(58)90136-7.
- —; et al. (1961). "Relationship between crystal symmetry and magnetic properties of ionic compounds containing Mn^{3+}". Physical Review. 124 (2): 373–84. Bibcode:1961PhRv..124..373G. doi:10.1103/PhysRev.124.373.
- —; et al. (1960). "Interpretation of the Magnetic and Crystallographic Properties of Several Iron, Nickel, and Iron-Nickel Nitrides". Journal of Applied Physics. 31 (5): S342 – S3. Bibcode:1960JAP....31S.342G. doi:10.1063/1.1984739.
- — (1963). "Atomic moments and magnetic coupling in cation excess-nickel arsenides". Journal of Applied Physics. 34 (4): 1193–4. Bibcode:1963JAP....34.1193G. doi:10.1063/1.1729430.
- — (1967). "Spontaneous band magnetism". Journal of Applied Physics. 38 (3): 1054–6. Bibcode:1967JAP....38.1054G. doi:10.1063/1.1709483.
- —; et al. (1967). "Theory of the magnetic properties of the ilmenites MTiO_{3}". Physical Review. 164 (2): 768–78. Bibcode:1967PhRv..164..768G. doi:10.1103/PhysRev.164.768.
- — (1968). "Localized vs collective descriptions of magnetic electrons". Journal of Applied Physics. 39 (2): 403–11. Bibcode:1968JAP....39..403G. doi:10.1063/1.2163457.
- — (1968). "Magnetic properties of SrRuO_{3} and CaRuO_{3}". Journal of Applied Physics. 39 (2): 1327–8. Bibcode:1968JAP....39.1327L. doi:10.1063/1.1656282.
- —; et al. (1968). "Resistivity and magnetic order in Ti_{2}O_{3}". Journal of Applied Physics. 39 (2): 594–5. Bibcode:1968JAP....39..594V. doi:10.1063/1.2163536.
- —; et al. (1969). "Effects of pressure on the magnetic properties of MnAs". Physical Review. 177 (2): 942–51. Bibcode:1969PhRv..177..942M. doi:10.1103/PhysRev.177.942.
- —; et al. (1970). "Magnetic and optical properties of the high- and low-pressure forms of CsCoF_{3}". Journal of Applied Physics. 41 (3): 935–6. Bibcode:1970JAP....41..935L. doi:10.1063/1.1659031.
- — (1971). "Conceptual phase diagram and its application to the spontaneous magnetism of several pyrites". J Solid State Chem. 3 (1): 26–38. Bibcode:1971JSSCh...3...26G. doi:10.1016/0022-4596(71)90004-1.
- —; et al. (1972). "Effects of Co^{2+} and Mn^{3+} ion substitutions on the anisotropy and magnetostriction constants of Y_{3}Fe_{5}O_{12}". Mater Res Bull. 7 (8): 749–59. doi:10.1016/0025-5408(72)90123-7.
- — (1972). "Comment on the magnetic properties of several indium thiospinels". J Solid State Chem. 4 (2): 292–3. Bibcode:1972JSSCh...4..292G. doi:10.1016/0022-4596(72)90120-X.
- — (1973). "Interpretation of structure and magnetism in transition-metal pnictides M_{2}X and (M_{1−x}M′_{x})_{2}X". J Solid State Chem. 7 (4): 428–47. doi:10.1016/0022-4596(73)90172-2.
- —; et al. (1973). "Etude comparative du comportement magnetique des phases LaNiO_{3} et LaCuO_{3}". Mater Res Bull. 8 (6): 647–55. doi:10.1016/0025-5408(73)90057-3.
- —; et al. (1973). "Crystal chemistry and magnetic properties of Cr^{II}B^{III}F_{5} compounds". Mater Res Bull. 8 (12): 1467–77. doi:10.1016/0025-5408(73)90032-9.
- —; et al. (1974). "Propriétés electriques et magnétiques des solutions solides La_{x}Eu_{1-x}B_{6}". J Solid State Chem. 9 (1): 37–47. Bibcode:1974JSSCh...9...37M. doi:10.1016/0022-4596(74)90052-8.
- —; et al. (1974). "Crystallography, magnetism, and band structure of Mn_{5}Ni_{2}Bi_{4}-type compounds". Phys Rev B. 10 (1): 120–7. Bibcode:1974PhRvB..10..120S. doi:10.1103/PhysRevB.10.120.
- —; et al. (1975). "Etude des proprietes magnetiques, electriques et optiques des phases de structure perovskite SrVO_{2.90} et SrVO_{3}". J Solid State Chem. 14 (3): 247–59. Bibcode:1975JSSCh..14..247D. doi:10.1016/0022-4596(75)90029-8.
- —; et al. (1975). "The influence of 3d transition metal substitution on the magnetic properties of MnGaGe". J Phys Chem Solids. 36 (5): 451–5. Bibcode:1975JPCS...36..451G. doi:10.1016/0022-3697(75)90073-6.

=== Ferromagnetism ===
- — (1954). "A theory of domain creation and coercive force in polycrystalline ferromagnetics". Physical Review. 95 (4): 917–32. Bibcode:1954PhRv...95..917G. doi:10.1103/PhysRev.95.917.
- —; et al. (1955). "Magnetic materials for digital-computer components. I. A theory of flux reversal in polycrystalline ferromagnetics". Journal of Applied Physics. 26 (1): 8–18. Bibcode:1955JAP....26....8M. doi:10.1063/1.1721867.
- —; et al. (1958). "Some Ferrimagnetic Properties of the System Li_{x}Ni_{1−x}O". Journal of Applied Physics. 29 (3): 382–3. Bibcode:1958JAP....29..382G. doi:10.1063/1.1723144.
- —; et al. (1960). "Interpretation of the Magnetic and Crystallographic Properties of Several Iron, Nickel, and Iron-Nickel Nitrides". Journal of Applied Physics. 31 (5): S342 – S3. Bibcode:1960JAP....31S.342G. doi:10.1063/1.1984739.
- — (1964). "Jahn-Teller distortions induced by tetrahedral-site Fe^{2+} ions". J Phys Chem Solids. 25 (2): 151–60. Bibcode:1964JPCS...25..151G. doi:10.1016/0022-3697(64)90073-3.
- —; et al. (1968). "Band antiferromagnetism and the new perovskite CaCrO_{3}". Mater Res Bull. 3 (6): 471–81. doi:10.1016/0025-5408(68)90070-6.
- —; et al. (1970). "Effects of hydrostatic pressure and of Jahn-Teller distortions on the magnetic properties of RbFeF3". Phys Rev B. 2 (11): 4640–5. doi:10.1103/PhysRevB.2.4640.
- —; et al. (1978). "Les oxynitrures d'europium semiconducteurs ferromagnetiques. Proprietes magnetiques et electriques". J Phys Chem Solids. 39 (5): 539–49. Bibcode:1978JPCS...39..539C. doi:10.1016/0022-3697(78)90033-1.

=== In spinels ===
- —; et al. (1955). "Theory of ionic ordering, crystal distortion, and magnetic exchange due to covalent forces in spinels". Physical Review. 98 (2): 391–408. Bibcode:1955PhRv...98..391G. doi:10.1103/PhysRev.98.391.
- —; et al. (1959). "Suggestion concerning magnetic interactions in spinels". Physical Review. 115 (5): 1156–8. Bibcode:1959PhRv..115.1156W. doi:10.1103/PhysRev.115.1156.

== Manganites ==
- — (1955). "Theory of the role of covalence in the perovskite-type manganites [La,M(II)]MnO_{3}". Physical Review. 100 (2): 564–73. Bibcode:1955PhRv..100..564G. doi:10.1103/PhysRev.100.564.
- — (1956). "Interpretation of domain patterns recently found in BiMn and SiFe alloys". Physical Review. 102 (2): 356–65. Bibcode:1956PhRv..102..356G. doi:10.1103/PhysRev.102.356.

== Metallic oxides ==
- — (1971). "Metallic oxides". Progress in Solid State Chemistry. 5(C): 145–399. doi:10.1016/0079-6786(71)90018-5.
- — (1975). "Oxide engineering". J Solid State Chem. 12 (3–4): 148–55. Bibcode:1975JSSCh..12..148G. doi:10.1016/0022-4596(75)90299-6.

== Methodology ==
- —; et al. (1969). "Pressure-effect measurements using a vibrating-coil magnetometer". Journal of Applied Physics. 40 (3): 1324–6. Bibcode:1969JAP....40.1324M. doi:10.1063/1.1657655.
- —; et al. (1975). "Toward a theory of test data selection". ACM SIGPLAN Notices. 10 (6): 493–510. doi:10.1145/390016.808473. Also published as "Toward a Theory of Test Data Selection". IEEE Trans Software Eng. SE-1(2) (2): 156–73. 1975. doi:10.1109/TSE.1975.6312836.
- —; et al. (1975). "Correction to "Toward a Theory of Test Data Selection"". IEEE Trans Software Eng. SE-1(4) (4): 425–6. doi:10.1109/TSE.1975.6312876.

=== Software ===
- — (1965). "A lightpen-controlled program for online data analysis". Commun ACM. 8 (2): 130–4. doi:10.1145/363744.363789.
- —; et al. (1975). "Software engineering: Process, principles, and goals". Computer. 8 (5): 17–27. doi:10.1109/C-M.1975.218952.

== Perovskites ==
- — (1955). "Theory of the role of covalence in the perovskite-type manganites [La,M(II)]MnO_{3}". Physical Review. 100 (2): 564–73. Bibcode:1955PhRv..100..564G. doi:10.1103/PhysRev.100.564.
- — (1958). "An interpretation of the magnetic properties of the perovskite-type mixed crystals La_{1-x}Sr_{x}CoO_{3−λ}". J Phys Chem Solids. 6 (2–3): 287–97. Bibcode:1958JPCS....6..287G. doi:10.1016/0022-3697(58)90107-0.
- —; et al. (1965). "Complex vs band formation in perovskite oxides". Journal of Applied Physics. 36 (3): 1031–2. Bibcode:1965JAP....36.1031G. doi:10.1063/1.1714087.
- — (1966). "Covalency criterion for localized vs collective electrons in oxides with the perovskite structure". Journal of Applied Physics. 37 (3): 1415–22. Bibcode:1966JAP....37.1415G. doi:10.1063/1.1708496.
- —; et al. (1966). "Single-crystal growth and properties of the perovskites LaVO_{3} and YVO_{3}". Journal of Applied Physics. 37 (3): 1431–2. Bibcode:1966JAP....37.1431R. doi:10.1063/1.1708499.
- — (1967). "Localized versus collective d electrons and Néel temperatures in perovskite and perovskite-pelated structures". Physical Review. 164 (2): 785–9. Bibcode:1967PhRv..164..785G. doi:10.1103/PhysRev.164.785.
- —; et al. (1968). "Band antiferromagnetism and the new perovskite CaCrO_{3}". Mater Res Bull. 3 (6): 471–81. doi:10.1016/0025-5408(68)90070-6.

== Pyrite ==
- — (1971). "Conceptual phase diagram and its application to the spontaneous magnetism of several pyrites". J Solid State Chem. 3 (1): 26–38. Bibcode:1971JSSCh...3...26G. doi:10.1016/0022-4596(71)90004-1.
- — (1972). "Energy bands in TX_{2} compounds with pyrite, marcasite, and arsenopyrite structures". J Solid State Chem. 5 (1): 144–52. Bibcode:1972JSSCh...5..144G. doi:10.1016/0022-4596(72)90022-9.

== Spinels ==
- —; et al. (1955). "Theory of ionic ordering, crystal distortion, and magnetic exchange due to covalent forces in spinels". Physical Review. 98 (2): 391–408. Bibcode:1955PhRv...98..391G. doi:10.1103/PhysRev.98.391.
- —; et al. (1959). "Suggestion concerning magnetic interactions in spinels". Physical Review. 115 (5): 1156–8. Bibcode:1959PhRv..115.1156W. doi:10.1103/PhysRev.115.1156.
- —; et al. (1963). "The preparation and properties of some vanadium spinels". J Phys Chem Solids. 24 (3): 347–60. Bibcode:1963JPCS...24..347R. doi:10.1016/0022-3697(63)90193-8.
- —; et al. (1963). "Crystallographic transitions in several chromium spinel systems". Journal of Applied Physics. 34 (4): 1085–6. Bibcode:1963JAP....34.1085W. doi:10.1063/1.1729380.
- —; et al. (1964). "Electrical conductivity in the spinel system Co_{1−x}Li_{x}V_{2}O_{4}". Journal of Applied Physics. 35 (3): 1069–70. Bibcode:1964JAP....35.1069R. doi:10.1063/1.1713383.
- — (1967). "Tetrahedral-site copper in chalcogenide spinels". Solid State Commun. 5 (8): 577–80. Bibcode:1967SSCom...5..577G. doi:10.1016/0038-1098(67)90069-5.
- — (1969). "Descriptions of outer d electrons in thiospinels". J Phys Chem Solids. 30 (2): 261–80. Bibcode:1969JPCS...30..261G. doi:10.1016/0022-3697(69)90308-4.
- — (1970). "Seebeck coefficients in vanadium spinels". Mater Res Bull. 5 (8): 621–9. doi:10.1016/0025-5408(70)90103-0.
- — (1972). "Comment on the magnetic properties of several indium thiospinels". J Solid State Chem. 4 (2): 292–3. Bibcode:1972JSSCh...4..292G. doi:10.1016/0022-4596(72)90120-X.

== Transition metals ==
- — (1958). "Suggestion concerning the role of wave-function symmetry in transition metals and their alloys". Journal of Applied Physics. 29 (3): 513–5. Bibcode:1958JAP....29..513G. doi:10.1063/1.1723203.
- — (1960). "Band structure of transition metals and their alloys". Physical Review. 120 (1): 67–83. Bibcode:1960PhRv..120...67G. doi:10.1103/PhysRev.120.67.
- — (1967). "Narrow-band electrons in transition-metal oxides". Czech J Phys. 17 (4): 304–36. Bibcode:1967CzJPh..17..304G. doi:10.1007/BF01691621.
- — (1968). "Spin-orbit-coupling effects in transition-metal compounds". Physical Review. 171 (2): 466–79. Bibcode:1968PhRv..171..466G. doi:10.1103/PhysRev.171.466.
- — (1972). "Influence of atomic vacancies on the properties of transition-metal oxides. I. TiO_{x} and VO_{x}". Phys Rev B. 5 (8): 2764–74. Bibcode:1972PhRvB...5.2764G. doi:10.1103/PhysRevB.5.2764.
- — (1973). "Interpretation of structure and magnetism in transition-metal pnictides M_{2}X and (M_{1−x}M′_{x})_{2}X". J Solid State Chem. 7 (4): 428–47. doi:10.1016/0022-4596(73)90172-2.
- —; et al. (1975). "The influence of 3d transition metal substitution on the magnetic properties of MnGaGe". J Phys Chem Solids. 36 (5): 451–5. Bibcode:1975JPCS...36..451G. doi:10.1016/0022-3697(75)90073-6.

== Other ==
- —; et al. (1958). "Domain-wall structure in permalloy films". Journal of Applied Physics. 29 (3): 294–5. Bibcode:1958JAP....29..294H. doi:10.1063/1.1723105.
- — (1965). "Chemical inhomogeneities and square B-H loops". Journal of Applied Physics. 36 (8): 2342–6. Bibcode:1965JAP....36.2342G. doi:10.1063/1.1714487.
- —; et al. (1965). "Contextual correlates of synonymy". Commun ACM. 8 (10): 627–33. doi:10.1145/365628.365657.
- —; et al. (1967). "Superconducting transition temperature and electronic structure in the pseudobinaries Nb_{3}Al-Nb_{3}Sn and Nb_{3}Sn-Nb_{3}Sb". J Phys Chem Solids. 28 (5): 889–95. Bibcode:1967JPCS...28..889B. doi:10.1016/0022-3697(67)90018-2.
- —; et al. (1967). "High-pressure study of the first-order phase transition in MnAs". Physical Review. 157 (2): 389–95. Bibcode:1967PhRv..157..389G. doi:10.1103/PhysRev.157.389.
- — (1968). "Band model for transition-metal chalcogenides having layer structures with occupied trigonal-bipyramidal sites". Mater Res Bull. 3 (5): 409–15. doi:10.1016/0025-5408(68)90031-7.
- —; et al. (1969). "Pb_{2}M_{2}O_{7−x} (M = Ru, Ir, Re) - Preparation and properties of oxygen deficient pyrochlores". Mater Res Bull. 4 (3): 191–202. doi:10.1016/0025-5408(69)90056-7.
- —; et al. (1970). "Structure of the M_{x}V_{2}O_{5−β} and M_{x}V_{2−y}T_{y}O_{5−β} phases". J Solid State Chem. 1 (3–4): 339–48. doi:10.1016/0022-4596(70)90114-3.
- — (1970). "Interpretation of M_{x}V_{2}O_{5−β} and M_{x}V_{2−y}T_{y}O_{5−β} phases". J Solid State Chem. 1 (3–4): 349–58. doi:10.1016/0022-4596(70)90115-5.
- —; et al. (1972). "Structure of orthorhombic V_{0.95}Cr_{0.05}O_{2}". Phys Rev B. 5 (10): 4104–11. Bibcode:1972PhRvB...5.4104P. doi:10.1103/PhysRevB.5.4104.
- — (1973). "Interpretation of the transport properties of Ln_{2}NiO_{4} and Ln_{2}CuO_{4} compounds". Mater Res Bull. 8 (4): 423–31. doi:10.1016/0025-5408(73)90046-9.
- —; et al. (1973). "Structures and a two-band model for the system V_{1−x}Cr_{x}O_{2}". Phys Rev B. 8 (4): 1323–31. Bibcode:1973PhRvB...8.1323G. doi:10.1103/PhysRevB.8.1323.
- —; et al. (1973). "Exploring the A^{+}B^{5+}O_{3} compounds". J Solid State Chem. 6 (4): 493–501. Bibcode:1973JSSCh...6..493G. doi:10.1016/S0022-4596(73)80005-2.
- — (1975). "Exception Handling: Issues and a Proposed Notation". Commun ACM. 18 (12): 683–96. doi:10.1145/361227.361230.
- — (1975). "Exception handling design issues". ACM SIGPLAN Notices. 10 (7): 41–5. doi:10.1145/987305.987313.
- —; et al. (1976). "Fast Na^{+}-ion transport in skeleton structures". Mater Res Bull. 11 (2): 203–20. doi:10.1016/0025-5408(76)90077-5.
- —; et al. (1977). "Characterization of MNCrO_{3} and CrMNO_{4}". Inorg Chem. 16 (1): 44–6. doi:10.1021/ic50167a011.
- —; et al. (1977). "X-ray photoemission spectroscopy studies of Sn-doped indium-oxide films". Journal of Applied Physics. 48 (8): 3524–31. Bibcode:1977JAP....48.3524F. doi:10.1063/1.324149.
