= Michel Armand =

French scientist

Michel Armand (born 1946) is a French scientist who is best known for introducing the concept of a rocking-chair battery in 1978. In a rocking-chair battery, the same type of ion is de/intercalated into both positive and negative electrodes during dis/charge. As a result, solution-phase species do not appear in the reaction stoichiometry, which allows for minimizing the amount of solvent in the battery, reduces the battery weight and cost.

Michel grew up in Annecy, in the French Alps, in a family of science teachers. In 1968, he graduated from Ecole Normale Supérieure, where he became interested in electrochemistry and batteries. In 1970, he started his PhD studies at Stanford University with Robert Huggins as a Fulbright Scholar. Stanley Whittingham was a postdoc in the same laboratory at Stanford. Armand felt that the Stanford laboratory was overly focused on fundamental research, while he wanted to develop practical batteries. For this reason, he dropped out of Stanford's PhD program 18 months later and returned to France to finish his PhD at Université Joseph-Fourier in Grenoble.

While in graduate school, Armand was determined to find a practical way to intercalate lithium and potassium ions into graphite. He found that solvent co-intercalation presented a problem with lithium ions. For this reason, he decided to try a solid polymer electrolyte and obtained a patent on this idea. However, the lack of a suitable positive intercalation electrode material prevented the commercialization of that invention at that time.

Lithium batteries are electrochemical devices that are widely used as power sources. The history of their development has contributions from many scientists. In particular, without the developments by Professor Michel Armand related to electrodes and electrolytes, the lithium batteries of today would not exist as the foundation for electronic devices.

He runs a research team in Spain at CIC energiGUNE and has had his work published in Nature.

== See also ==
- Lithium iron phosphate battery
- Lithium-ion battery
