= Norman Hackerman Young Author Award =

The Norman Hackerman Young Author Award was established in 1982 by The Electrochemical Society (ECS). The award is presented annually for the best paper published in the Journal of the Electrochemical Society for a topic in the field of electrochemical science and technology by a young author or authors. (This award incorporates the Turner Book Prize.)

Recipients of the award are presented with a scroll, cash prize (divided equally among eligible authors), and travel assistance to enable winner(s) to attend the ECS meeting where the award is presented.

This award is named after the chemist Norman Hackerman.

== Notable Recipients ==
As listed by ECS:

- 1994 Hubert A. Gasteiger
- 1988 Jennifer A. Bardwell
- 1987 Joachim Maier
- 1975 Larry R. Faulkner
- 1971 M. Stanley Whittingham
- 1966 John Newman
- 1960 A. C. Makrides
- 1953 Jack Halpern
- 1948 Michael Streicher
- 1941 Edward Adler
- 1938 Nathaniel B. Nichols
- 1929 William C. Gardiner

== See also ==
- List of chemistry awards
