= Adam Heller =

Israeli-American engineer (born 1933)

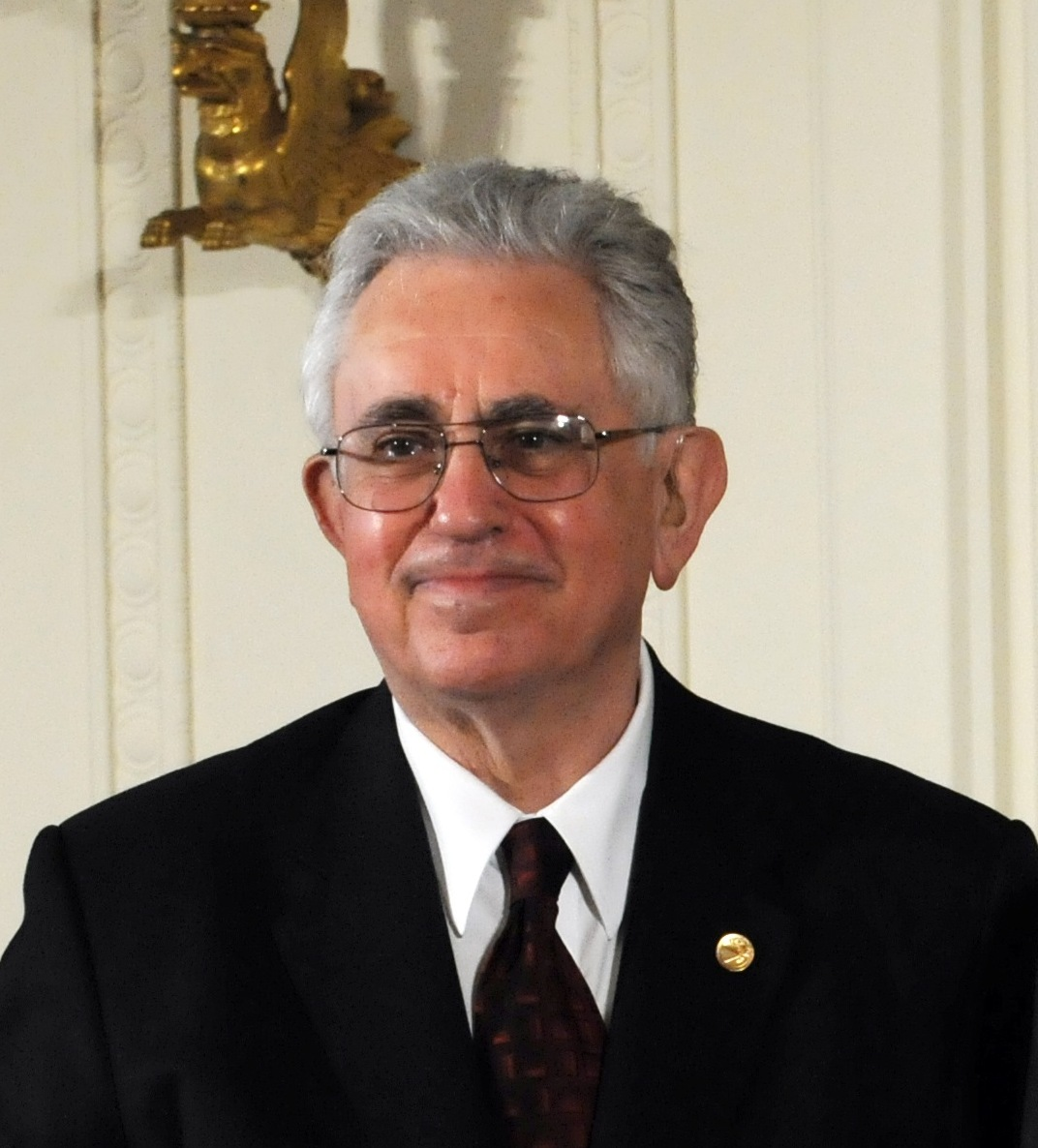
- Heller in 2008
- Born: June 25, 1933 (age 93); Cluj, Romania
- Education: Hebrew University
- Scientific career
- Fields: Chemical Engineering
- Workplaces: Bell Laboratories; GTE Laboratories; University of Texas at Austin
- Doctoral advisor: Ernst David Bergmann
- Notable students: Yaron Paz; David Eisenberg

Adam Heller (born June 25, 1933) is an Israeli American scientist and engineer. He is Chief Science Officer of SynAgile Corp. of Wilson, Wyoming, consults to Abbott Diabetes Care of Alameda, California, and is Ernest Cockrell Sr. Chair Emeritus of Engineering at The University of Texas at Austin. His 1973 paper with James J. Auborn established the feasibility of high energy density, high-voltage, non-rechargeable lithium batteries. Their 3.6-volt lithium thionyl chloride and 3.7-volt lithium sulfuryl chloride batteries remain in use in applications requiring very high energy density and a shelf life of 20 years or more.

In 1996, Heller co-founded with his son Ephraim Heller TheraSense Inc. In 2000, the company's Freestyle micro-coulometric blood glucose assaying system made the monitoring of blood glucose by diabetic people painless by reducing the required blood volume to 300 nL. TheraSense was acquired by Abbott Laboratories in 2004 for $1.2 billion.

Between 1987 and 2010 Heller introduced electron conducting hydrogels, the only known aqueous phases that conduct electrons having no leached redox couples. With these he electrically wired reaction centers of electron transferring enzymes to electrodes, transducing their turnover rates to electrical currents. Using electrically wired glucose oxidase he and his team engineered prototypes of subcutaneously implanted continuously glucose monitoring systems. These were developed by his colleagues at Abbott Diabetes Care, who created the world's most widely used FreeStyle Libre continuously glucose monitoring systems for diabetes management.

His continuous non-invasive oral drug delivery system forms the basis of SynAgile Corporation's investigational DopaFuse L-DOPA/Carbidopa delivery system for managing Parkinson's disease.

According to Google Scholar, Heller's patents and publications were cited 133,300 times and their h-index was 176 as of December 12, 2021. Heller is co-inventor or inventor of 293 granted US Patents and he ranks #192 on Wikipedia's List of the World's Most Prolific Inventors.

== Biography ==
=== Holocaust ===
Adam Heller was born in 1933 to Jewish parents in Cluj, Kingdom of Romania. In 1944, following the Second Vienna Award, the Hungarian administration confiscated his family's property, and they were forcibly relocated along with more than 18,000 other Jews to the Kolozsvár Ghetto within the walls of the Iris Brickyard. In late May of the same year, the prisoners of the ghetto at Kolozsvár were transported out of the ghetto as part of the Nazi Final Solution. Heller and his immediate family survived on Kastner's train. In 1945, he arrived in British Mandate Palestine, which became the State of Israel in 1948.

=== Education ===
Heller received his M.Sc. and Ph.D. from Hebrew University in 1961, where he studied under Ernst David Bergmann. In 1962-1963 he was a Post-doctoral Research Fellow at University of California, Berkeley and in 1963-1964 he was a Postdoctoral Member of the Technical Staff of Bell Laboratories in Murray Hill, New Jersey.

== Technology ==
=== Lithium batteries ===
With James J. Auborn and Kenneth W. French, Heller showed that unlike in water metallic lithium does not corrode in the boiling inorganic oxychlorides thionyl chloride or sulfuryl chloride. The metal's surface is passivated against corrosion by a thin film of lithium chloride. They introduced in 1973 the 3.6 V non-rechargeable lithium thionyl chloride battery, one of the first to be mass manufactured. Because of its lightweight lithium metal anode and its carbon cathode on which the thionyl chloride or sulfuryl chloride solvent of the electrolyte is electrocatalytically reduced, the battery's energy density is uniquely high, 1210 Wh/L and 720 Wh/kg. The battery's shelf-life of over 20 years derives of absence of lithium corrosion in thionyl chloride and in sulfuryl chloride. As of December 15, 2021, its manufacture continued.

=== Painless blood glucose monitoring ===
With his son Ephraim Heller, in 1996 Heller co-founded TheraSense, a company acquired by Abbott Laboratories in 2004 for $1.2 billion. The company is now Abbott Diabetes Care. Heller was the first Chief Technical Officer of TheraSense and as of December 2021 continued to consult to Abbott Diabetes Care. TheraSense introduced in 2000 the FreeStyle micro-coulometer, painlessly measuring the blood glucose concentration in 300 nanoliters of blood. The world's most widely used FreeStyle Libre continuous glucose monitoring system of Abbott Diabetes Care was introduced in 2016. Its subcutaneously implanted amperometric sensor utilizes concepts of Heller's glucose concentration to electron current transducing electrically wired glucose oxidase electrode maintaining a constant sensitivity through a polymeric membrane that controls the inflow of glucose.

=== Continuous oral delivery of L-DOPA for managing Parkinson's disease ===
Heller serves as Chief Scientific Officer of Synagile Corporation, a venture developing a continuous oral L-DOPA systems for managing advanced Parkinson's disease.

== Research ==
=== Neodymium liquid lasers ===
Heller showed in 1966 that the cause of radiationless relaxation of excited rare earth ions in solutions was energy transfer to hydrogen atom containing solvents that vibrate at high frequencies. By dissolving neodymium salts in selenium oxychloride, he created the first inorganic liquid lasers.

=== Electrochemical solar cells and environmental photocatalysis ===
At Bell Laboratories (1975-1988), where he headed the Electronic Materials Research Department (1977-1988) and King L. Tai developed high-speed electronic and optoelectronic interconnection technologies, his personal studies centered on semiconductor liquid junction solar cells. His electrical power and hydrogen generating photoelectrochemical solar cells were the first to reach solar conversion efficiencies of 10%. At The University of Texas at Austin Heinz Gerischer and he showed in 1989-1991 that the rate of photo-assisted oxidation of organic compounds on titanium dioxide was not controlled by the rate of photogeneration of electron hole pairs, but by the rate of reduction of adsorbed oxygen by trapped electrons. With the floating titanium dioxide coated cenospheres, the residues of coal combustion, he and colleagues catalyzed the sunlight assisted oxidation of thin films of crude oil on water (1992-1995), then with Yaron Paz he made in 1993-1995 transparent titanium dioxide films on window glass that under sunlight catalytically oxidized organic contaminants.

=== Electron conducting redox hydrogels ===
After discovering in 1987 at Bell Labs with Yinon Degani that the glycoprotein of glucose oxidase can be made electron conducting by covalently binding to it redox functions through which electrons hopped, Heller and his colleagues designed at the University of Texas between 1989 and 2005 electron conducting redox hydrogels, the first and only aqueous phases that conducted electrons, yet also dissolved ions and substrates and products of enzyme catalyzed reactions. Their hydrogels conduct electrons by collisional electron transfer between reduced and oxidized water-swollen polymer segments. By electrostatically bonding electron conducting gels having polycationic polymers and enzymes with polyanionic domains, they prevented the phase separation of differing macromolecules, then crosslinked on electrodes multilayers of electrically wired enzymes. To maintain the selectivity of the enzymes for their substrates and avoid electrooxidation of spurious biochemicals in biological fluids, the redox potentials of the hydrogels were kept neat the potentials of the reaction centers of the enzymes. Miniature electrodes coated with wired glucose oxidase transduced the concentration-dependent substrate flux to an electrical current, the current representing the turnover rate of reaction centers of the enzyme.

The absence of leachable matter from wired enzyme electrodes enabled their use in the blood of animals and in their subcutaneous fluid. To maintain the constancy of the transduction of substrate concentration into an electrical current, Heller and his coworkers overcoated the “wired” enzyme electrodes with a stable polymer films that controlled the influx of the substrate and with a non-fouling hydrogel. These elements of design, first tested with a subcutaneously “wired” glucose oxidase electrode in a diabetic chimpanzee in 1998, were later improved on and became applied in the subcutaneously implanted glucose monitoring FreeStyle Libre systems of Abbott Diabetes Care, the most widely used for managing diabetes.

=== Crystals in the Alzheimer’s disease entorhinal cortex ===
Heller's 2018-2020 studies revealed the presence of potentially pathogenic endogenous hydrated calcium oxalate crystals and exogenous titanium dioxide crystals in the substantia nigra of Parkinson's disease patients and in the entorhinal cortex of deceased Alzheimer's disease patients.

== Awards and recognition ==
In a 2008 White House ceremony, President George W. Bush awarded Adam Heller for his innovations in electrochemical diabetes management technologies the 2007 United States National Medal of Technology and Innovation, the highest technology award in the United States.

For his electrochemical biosensors that improved the lives of diabetic people worldwide Heller was elected to the American Academy of Arts and Sciences in 2009; was made the 78th Honorary Member of The Electrochemical Society in 2015; the 2019 Honorable Member of the Israel Chemical Society; received the 2014 Service to Society Award of the American Institute of Chemical Engineers; the 2004 the Spiers Medal of the Royal Society of Chemistry, UK; the 2004 Charles N. Reilly Award of the Society of Electroanalytical Chemistry; the 2005 Fresenius Gold Medal and Prize of the Society of German Chemists; the 2008 Creative Invention of the American Chemical Society; the 2014 Torbern Bergman Medal of the Swedish Chemical Society (shared with Allen J. Bard); and in 2008, an Honorary Doctorate of Queen's College of the City University of New York. The German Diabetes Society named in 2020 one of its awards in his honor.

For his radiation-less relaxation studies in liquids, liquid lasers, primary lithium thionyl chloride battery, 10% efficient electrochemical solar cells and environmental photocatalysis, he was made in 1982 Guest Professor of the college de France; was elected to the U.S. National Academy of Engineering in 1987; received the 1994 Chemistry of Materials Awards of the American Chemical Society; the 1995 Engineering Practice Award of the American Institute of Chemical Engineers; the 2015 Heinz Gerischer Prize of European Section of The Electrochemical Society; and was made in 1991an Honorary Doctor of Uppsala University in Sweden.

For his contributions to electrochemical science and technology he received the 1978 Award of the Battery Division of The Electrochemical Society; the 1988 Vittorio de Nora Award of The Electrochemical Society; the 1987 David C. Grahame Award of the Physical Electrochemistry Division of The Electrochemical Society; and the 1996 Faraday Medal of the electrochemistry section of the Royal Society of Chemistry, UK.
