= Michael M. Thackeray =

Michael Makepeace Thackeray FRS (born in 1949) is a South African chemist and battery materials researcher. He is mainly known for his work on electrochemically active cathode materials. In the mid-1980s he co-discovered the manganese oxide spinel family of cathodes for lithium ion batteries while working in the lab of John Goodenough at the University of Oxford. In 1998, while at Argonne National Laboratory, he led a team that first reported the NMC cathode technology. Patent protection around the concept and materials were first issued in 2005 to Argonne National Laboratory to a team with Thackeray, Khalil Amine, Jaekook Kim, and Christopher Johnson. The reported invention is now widely used in consumer electronics and electric vehicles.

== Career ==
Thackeray obtained his M.Sc and Ph.D. in Chemistry at the University of Cape Town, South Africa. After University, he worked for the CSIR of South Africa from 1973 to 1977 as a researcher in the National Physical Research Laboratory in Pretoria. From 1981-82, as well as in 1985, he worked with John Goodenough at the University of Oxford. In 1983 Thackeray returned to CSIR as Group Leader of the Ceramics Division and in 1988 was named a Research Manager in the Battery Technology Unit. In 1994, Thackeray moved to the Chemical Technology Division at Argonne National Laboratory in the United States, where he was named Group Leader of the Battery Materials Group within the Electrochemical Energy Storage Department. He was the founding director of the Center for Electrochemical Energy Science (CEES), a Department of Energy Energy Frontier Research Center, where he oversaw research to understand lithium-air storage chemistry, polymerized cathode coatings, and cathode surface stability. He retired in 2019.

Thackeray has co-authored more than 200 publications, and he holds more than 60 patents.

He was elected Fellow of The Electrochemical Society in 2014 and Fellow of the Royal Society in 2022. He received the Electrochemical Society Battery Division Research Award in 2005, the Yeager Award of International Battery Association in 2011 and the International Battery Association Medal of Excellence in 2019.
