= Laura H. Lewis =

American electronic materials scientist and engineer

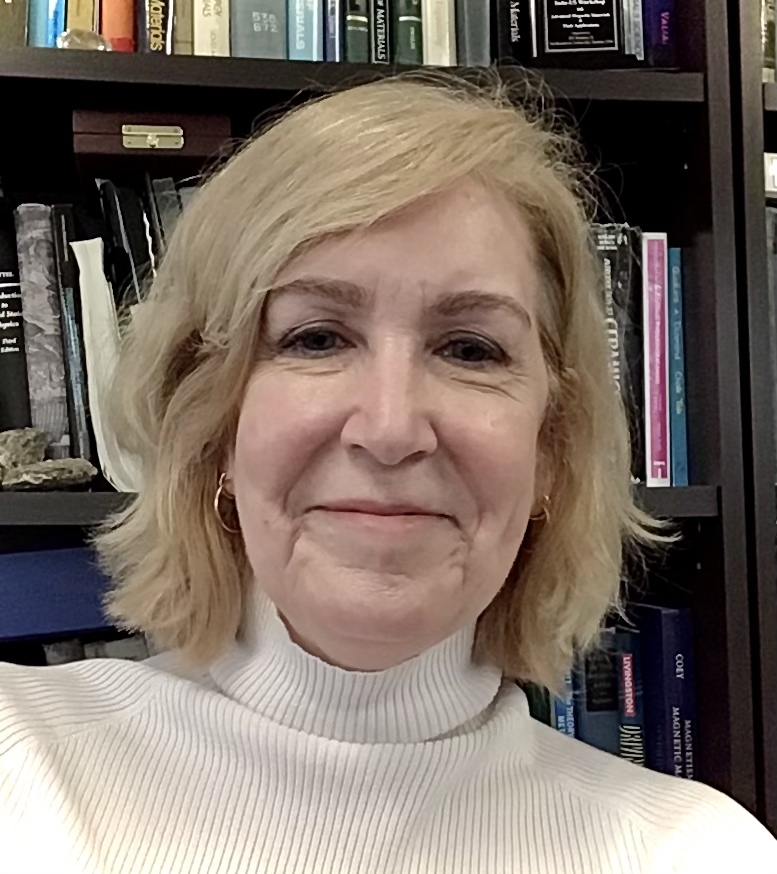

Academic background
- Education: BA, Physics, 1985, University of California, San Diego; MS, Electronic Materials, 1988, Massachusetts Institute of Technology; Ph.D., Materials Science and Engineering, 1993, University of Texas at Austin
- Thesis: The crystal chemistry and role of metal-metal bonding in the monochalcogenides TiS, VS, TiSe, VSe and their solid solutions (1993)
- Doctoral advisor: John B. Goodenough

Laura Henderson Lewis is an American electronic materials scientist and engineer. She is a distinguished university professor at Northeastern University, having previously served as the department chair of Northeastern University's chemical engineering department. Prior to her Northeastern University position, she was a research group leader and associate department chair in the nanoscience department of Brookhaven National Laboratory (BNL).

== Early life and education ==
Lewis graduated with her Bachelor of Arts in physics with specialization in earth sciences from the University of California, San Diego in 1985. Following this, she enrolled at the Massachusetts Institute of Technology (MIT) for her master's degree in electronic materials and the University of Texas at Austin for her PhD in materials science and engineering under the advisement of Nobel Laureate in Chemistry John B. Goodenough.

== Career ==
Prior to accepting a faculty position at Northeastern University, Lewis was a research group leader and associate department chair in the nanoscience department of Brookhaven National Laboratory and inaugural deputy director of the Brookhaven Center for Functional Nanomaterials.

As the Cabot Professor of chemical engineering and professor of mechanical and industrial engineering in the college of engineering, Lewis researches magnetic and electronic materials at the atomic level. She collaborated with Northeastern researchers to engineer new magnetic materials that do not utilize rare earth elements. Her research team worked to manipulate material structures at the atomic level to develop superior magnetic properties. In 2016, Lewis was awarded a National Science Foundation (NSF) grant for her project "Sustainable Permanent Magnets For Advanced Applications." In the same year, Lewis was elected a Fellow of the American Physical Society (APS) "for investigations of fundamental structure-property relationships in functional magnetic materials from a unified perspective, specifically for advancing permanent magnet, magnetic cooling, and biomedical applications." She later received a Fulbright Scholarship grant to Spain in the field of materials science as part of a project to tailor magnetic microwires for advanced applications.

During her tenure at Northeastern, Lewis has participated on a number of advisory panels and currently serves on the scientific advisory board of the Critical Materials Institute (a DOE Energy Innovation Hub) and is a member of the U.S. Technical Advisory Groups to develop supply chain and sustainability standards ISO TC298 (Rare Earths) and ISO TC333 (Lithium), American National Standards Institute (ANSI). In 2018, Lewis was one of the invited speakers during the Magnetism Winter School 2018 held in Bangkok, Thailand. Upon returning to North America, she was promoted to the rank of university distinguished professor, the highest honor the university can bestow upon a faculty member. Lewis was also recognized by her alma mater, the University of Texas at Austin, as one of their "2018 Mechanical Engineering Academy of Distinguished Alumni Honorees" for her "superior professional achievement, community service, and service to the University." Lewis is also a senior member of the Institute of Electrical and Electronics Engineers (IEEE) and was conference editor of the IEEE Transactions on Magnetics and chair of the IEEE Magnetics Society's technical committee.

During the COVID-19 pandemic, Lewis received a research grant from the NSF and published Lattice-Defective Copper Oxides as a Biocidal Tool for COVID-19 and Beyond to address a "need for new types of surface treatments that exhibit antipathogenic "contact-kill" capabilities to protect public health and welfare." In 2021, she was the co-recipient of a FY22 TIER 1 Interdisciplinary Research Seed Grant for her project "Evaluating New Detection Modalities for Covert Pharmaceutical Authentication and Beyond."

== Personal life ==
Lewis is married to Brookhaven National Laboratory atmospheric scientist Ernie Lewis.
