= Koichi Mizushima (scientist) =

Japanese researcher (born 1941)

- Born: 30 January 1941 (age 85); Tokyo, Japan
- Education: University of Tokyo
- Known for: Discovery of LiCoO2 for Li-ion battery
- Scientific career
- Workplaces: University of Oxford; University of Tokyo; Toshiba

Koichi Mizushima (水島公一, Mizushima Kōichi; born January 30, 1941) is a Japanese researcher known for discovering lithium cobalt oxide (LiCoO_{2}) and related materials for the lithium-ion battery (Li-ion battery). He was affiliated with the University of Tokyo before he went on to work for Toshiba.

== Early career ==
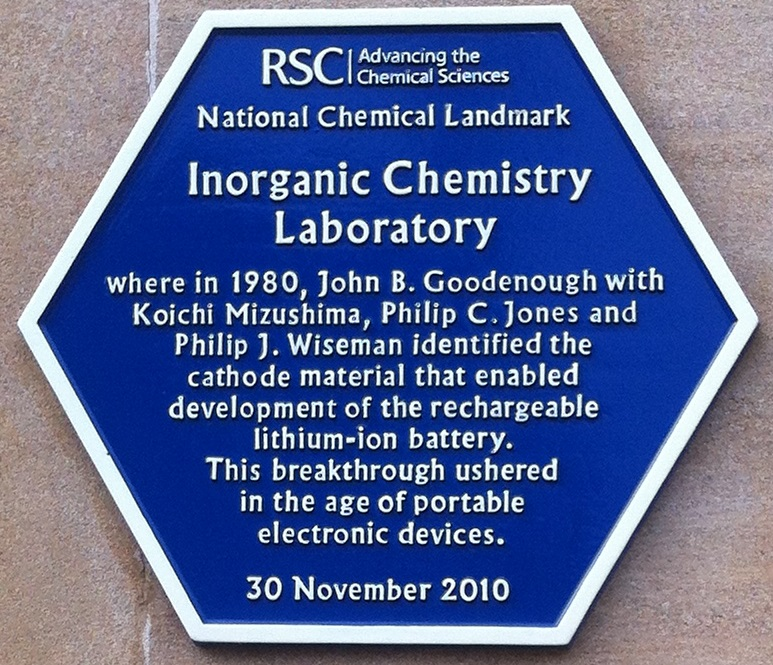
Blue plaque erected by the Royal Society of Chemistry commemorating work towards the rechargeable lithium-ion battery at Oxford

Koichi Mizushima was trained as a physicist at the University of Tokyo and received a PhD in Physics from the University of Tokyo. He worked for 13 years in the Physics Department at the University of Tokyo. In 1977, he was invited by Professor John Goodenough in the Inorganic Chemistry Department at Oxford University to join them as a research scientist. During his stay (1977-1979) at Oxford, Dr. Mizushima, along with John B. Goodenough, discovered LiCoO_{2} and related compounds now used for the cathode of the Li-ion battery. He went on to work for Toshiba.

== Recognition ==
- 1999 - Kato Memorial Prize
- 2007 - Fellow, The Japan Society of Applied Physics
- 2016 - NIMS Award (National Institute for Materials Science)
- 2019 - The University of Tokyo President's Special Award
