= Robert Huggins =

American materials scientist

- Born: 26 March 1929
- Education: Massachusetts Institute of Technology, Amherst College
- Occupations: University teacher, physicist, engineer
- Employers: Centre for Solar Energy and Hydrogen Research Baden-Württemberg; DARPA; Max Planck Institute for Biophysical Chemistry; Stanford University (1954–); University of Ulm

Robert Alan Huggins is professor emeritus at the Department of Materials Science and Engineering at the School of Engineering at Stanford University and Honorary Professor at the University of Kiel and the University of Ulm. He was previously Chief Scientist at the Center for Solar Energy and Hydrogen Research in Ulm. The International Society for Solid State Ionics (ISSI) held a symposium in his honor in 2009, in recognition of his work on fundamental properties and behavior of materials, solid state ionic probing techniques, catalytic behavior at gas–solid interfaces, and the development of electrodes for Lithium Ion batteries.

== Education ==
Robert Alan Huggins is the son of chemist Maurice Loyal Huggins, known for the Huggins equation and the Flory–Huggins theory.

Robert Huggins earned his BA in Physics from Amherst College, and went on to obtain an MS and Sc.D. in Metallurgy from the Massachusetts Institute of Technology, where he also served as an instructor.

== Career ==
Huggins joined the Stanford faculty in 1954. He established Stanford's Department of Materials Science and Engineering in 1959 and its Center for Materials Research program in 1961. He became a full professor in 1962. Huggins also served as Director of Materials Sciences at the Advanced Research Projects Agency (ARPA) in Washington, D.C. from 1968 to 1970.

Huggins spent a sabbatical in 1965 and 1966 working with Carl Wagner at the Max Planck Institute for Biophysical Chemistry in Göttingen, Germany, an experience he later described as pivotal for his later work on lithium-ion batteries. He was one of the founders of the Materials Research Society in 1973. In 1987 he co-founded the International Society for Solid State Ionics (ISSI), serving as its first President from 1987 to 1989. Huggins was the founding editor of the Annual Review of Materials Science from 1971 to 1993 and the editor of the journals Solid State Ionics and Materials Research Bulletin.

As of October 1991, Huggins became the Chief Scientist of the Energy Storage and Conversion Division at the Center for Solar Energy and Hydrogen Research (Zentrum für Sonnenenergie- und Wasserstoff- Forschung, ZSW) in Ulm, Germany. where he remained until 1995. He was named Honorary Professor at both the University of Ulm (1994) and the University of Kiel (2000) in Germany.

Huggins is the author, co-author or editor of over 400 publications including Advanced Batteries (2009) and Energy Storage: Fundamentals, Materials and Applications (2010, 1st; 2016, 2nd ed.) He holds at least 13 patents.

== Awards ==
- 2000, Honorary Professor, University of Kiel
- 1994, Honorary Professor, University of Ulm
- 1982, Battery Division Research Award, Electrochemical Society
- 1980, Case Centennial Scholar
- 1978, Vincent Bendix Award, American Society for Engineering Education
- 1977, Alexander von Humboldt Foundation Senior US Scientist Award
- 1965–1966, NSF Senior Postdoctoral Fellowship
- 1963, one of the Five Outstanding Men of California
- 1957, Robert Lansing Hardy Award, American Institute of Mining, Metallurgical, and Petroleum Engineers (AIME)

== Cold fusion ==
While at Stanford, Huggins attempted to recreate the controversial work of Stanley Pons and Martin Fleischmann on the eventually discredited theory of cold fusion. At one point he reported success. Only weeks later, such claims were rejected by a colleague.

== Bibliography ==
- Energy Storage, Springer | 2010 | ISBN 1-4419-1023-9 | 400 pages
- Advanced Batteries: Materials Science Aspects, Springer | 2008 | ISBN 0-387-76423-2 | 474 pages
