= John B. Goodenough =

American materials scientist (1922–2023)

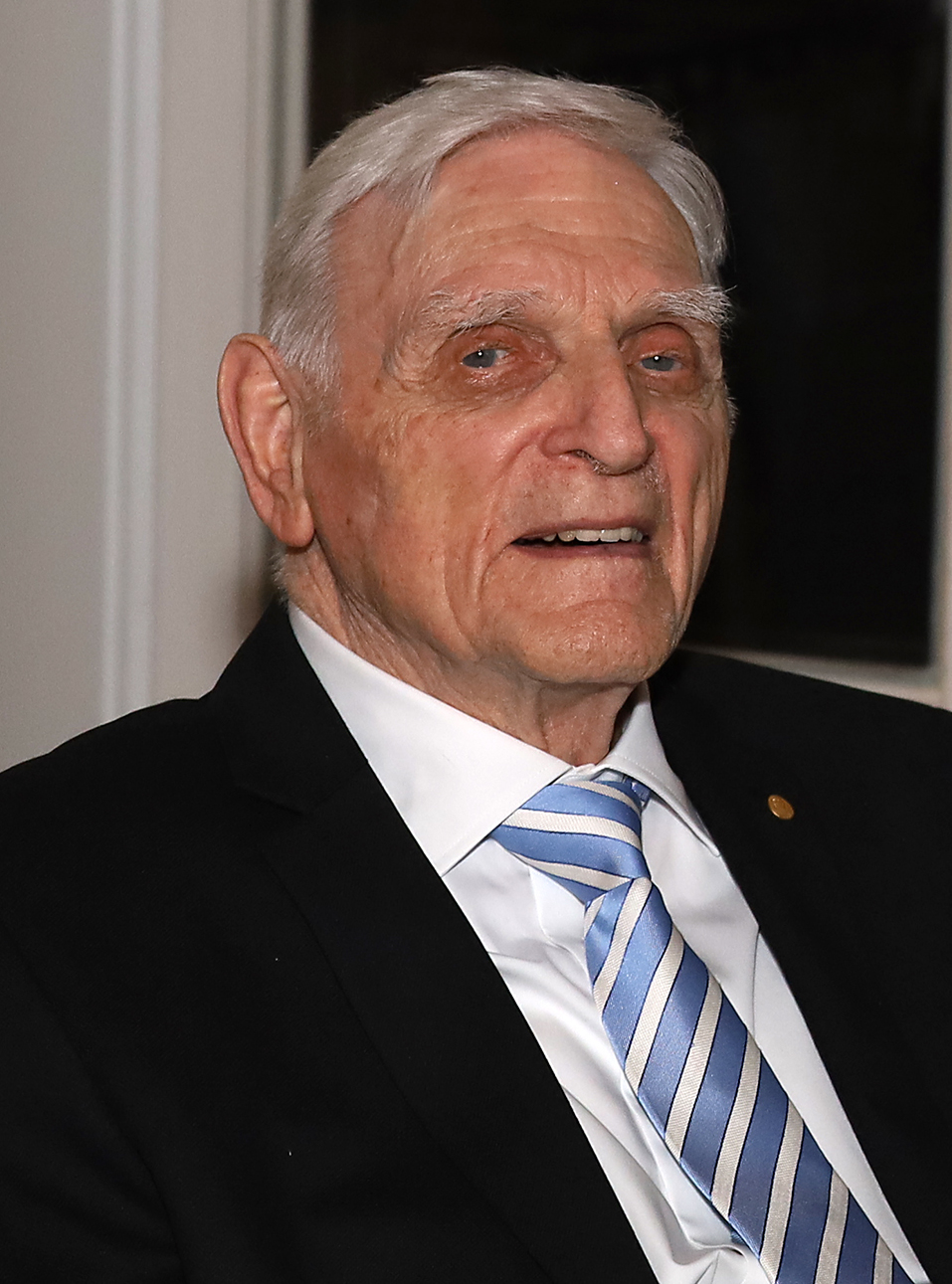
- Goodenough in 2019
- Born: John Bannister Goodenough; July 25, 1922; Jena, Thuringia, German Reich
- Died: June 25, 2023 (aged 100); Austin, Texas, U.S.
- Education: Yale University (BS); University of Chicago (MS, PhD)
- Known for: Li-ion rechargeable battery; Li-ion manganese oxide battery; Li-ion iron phosphate battery; Glass battery; Goodenough–Kanamori rules; Random-access memory
- Spouse: Irene Wiseman (m. 1951; died 2016)
- Parents: Erwin Ramsdell Goodenough (father); Helen Miriam Lewis (mother)
- Awards: Japan Prize (2001); Enrico Fermi Award (2009); National Medal of Science (2011); IEEE Medal for Environmental and Safety Technologies (2012); Charles Stark Draper Prize (2014); Welch Award (2017); Copley Medal (2019); Nobel Prize in Chemistry (2019)
- Scientific career
- Fields: Physics
- Workplaces: Massachusetts Institute of Technology; University of Oxford; University of Texas at Austin
- Thesis: A theory of the deviation from close packing in hexagonal metal crystals (1952)
- Doctoral advisor: Clarence Zener
- Doctoral students: Laura H. Lewis
- Other notable students: Bill David (postdoc); Arumugam Manthiram (postdoc)

John Bannister Goodenough (/ˈɡʊdɪnʌf/ GUUD-in-uf; July 25, 1922 – June 25, 2023) was an American materials scientist, a solid-state physicist, and a Nobel laureate in chemistry. From 1986 he was a professor of Materials Science, Electrical Engineering and Mechanical Engineering, at the University of Texas at Austin. He is credited with identifying the Goodenough–Kanamori rules of the sign of the magnetic superexchange in materials, with developing materials for computer random-access magnetic memory and with inventing cathode materials for lithium-ion batteries.

Goodenough was awarded the National Medal of Science, the Copley Medal, the Fermi Award, the Draper Prize, and the Japan Prize. The John B. Goodenough Award in materials science is named for him. In 2019, he was awarded the Nobel Prize in Chemistry alongside M. Stanley Whittingham and Akira Yoshino; at 97 years old, he became the oldest Nobel laureate in history. From August 27, 2021, until his death, he was the oldest living Nobel Prize laureate.

== Personal life and education ==
John Goodenough was born in Jena, Germany, on July 25, 1922, to American parents, Erwin Ramsdell Goodenough (1893–1965) and Helen Miriam (Lewis) Goodenough. He came from an academic family. His father, a graduate student at Oxford when John was born, eventually became a professor of religious history at Yale. His brother Ward became an anthropology professor at the University of Pennsylvania. John also had two half-siblings from his father's second marriage: Ursula Goodenough, emeritus professor of biology at Washington University in St. Louis; and Daniel Goodenough, emeritus professor of biology at Harvard Medical School.

In his school years Goodenough suffered from dyslexia. At the time, dyslexia was poorly understood by the medical community, and Goodenough's condition went undiagnosed and untreated. Although his primary schools considered him "a backward student," he taught himself to write so that he could take the entrance exam for Groton School, the boarding school where his older brother was studying at the time. He was awarded a full scholarship. At Groton, his grades improved and he eventually graduated at the top of his class in 1940. He also developed an interest in exploring nature, plants, and animals. Although he was raised an atheist, he converted to Protestant Christianity in high school.

After Groton, Goodenough graduated summa cum laude from Yale, where he was a member of Skull and Bones. He completed his coursework in early 1943 (after just two and a half years) and received his degree in 1944, covering his expenses by tutoring and grading exams. He had initially sought to enlist in the military following the Japanese attack on Pearl Harbor, but his mathematics professor convinced him to stay at Yale for another year so that he could finish his coursework, which qualified him to join the U.S. Army Air Corps' meteorology department.

After World War II ended, Goodenough obtained a master's degree and a Ph.D. in physics from the University of Chicago, the latter in 1952. His doctoral supervisor was Clarence Zener, a theorist in electrical breakdown; he also worked and studied with physicists, including Enrico Fermi and John A. Simpson. While at Chicago, he met Canadian history graduate student Irene Wiseman. They married in 1951. The couple had no children. Irene died in 2016.

Goodenough turned 100 on July 25, 2022. He died at an assisted living facility in Austin, Texas, on June 25, 2023, one month shy of what would have been his 101st birthday.

== Career and research ==
Goodenough discusses his research and career.

Over his career, Goodenough authored more than 550 articles, 85 book chapters and reviews, and five books, including two seminal works, Magnetism and the Chemical Bond (1963) and Les oxydes des metaux de transition (1973).

=== MIT Lincoln Laboratory ===
After his studies, Goodenough was a research scientist and team leader at the MIT Lincoln Laboratory for 24 years. At MIT, he was part of an interdisciplinary team responsible for developing random-access magnetic memory. His research focused on magnetism and on the metal–insulator transition behavior in transition-metal oxides. His research efforts on RAM led him to develop the concepts of cooperative orbital ordering, also known as a cooperative Jahn–Teller distortion, in oxide materials. They subsequently led him to develop (with Junjiro Kanamori) the Goodenough–Kanamori rules, a set of semi-empirical rules to predict the sign of the magnetic superexchange in materials; superexchange is a core property for high-temperature superconductivity.

=== University of Oxford ===
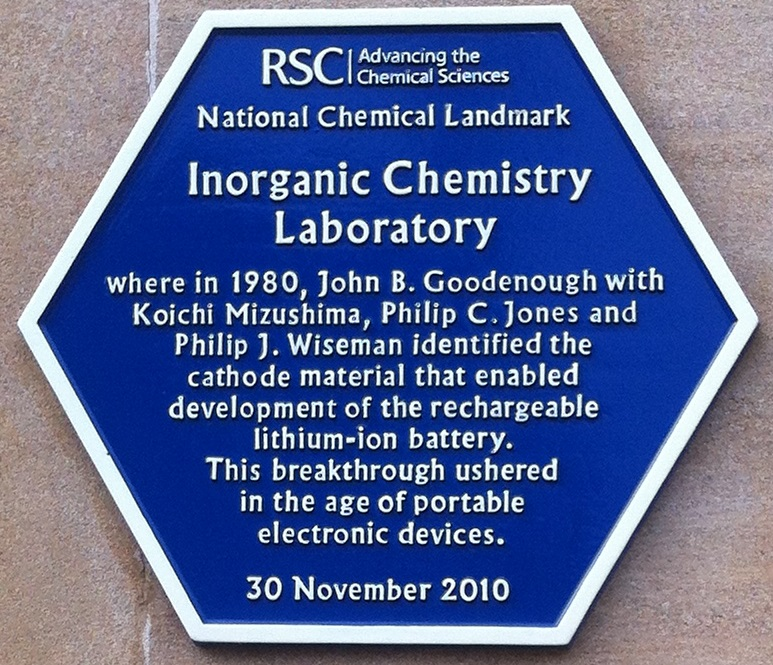
Blue plaque erected by the Royal Society of Chemistry commemorating work towards the rechargeable lithium-ion battery at Oxford

The U.S. government eventually terminated Goodenough's research funding, so during the late 1970s and early 1980s, he left the United States and continued his career as head of the Inorganic Chemistry Laboratory at the University of Oxford. Among the highlights of his work at Oxford, Goodenough is credited with significant research essential to the development of commercial lithium-ion rechargeable batteries. Goodenough was able to expand upon previous work from M. Stanley Whittingham on battery materials, and found in 1980 that by using Li_{x}CoO_{2} as a lightweight, high energy density cathode material, he could double the capacity of lithium-ion batteries.

Although Goodenough saw a commercial potential of batteries with his LiCoO_{2} and LiNiO_{2} cathodes and approached the University of Oxford with a request to patent this invention, it refused. Unable to afford the patenting expenses with his academic salary, Goodenough turned to UK's Atomic Energy Research Establishment in Harwell, which accepted his offer, but under the terms, which provided zero royalty payment to the inventors John B. Goodenough and Koichi Mizushima. In 1990, the AERE licensed Goodenough's patents to Sony Corporation, which was followed by other battery manufacturers. It was estimated, that the AERE made over 10 million British pounds from this licensing.

The work at Sony on further improvements to Goodenough's invention was led by Akira Yoshino, who had developed a scaled up design of the battery and manufacturing process. Goodenough received the Japan Prize in 2001 for his discoveries of the materials critical to the development of lightweight high energy density rechargeable lithium batteries, and he, Whittingham, and Yoshino shared the 2019 Nobel Prize in Chemistry for their research in lithium-ion batteries.

=== University of Texas ===
From 1986, Goodenough was a professor at the University of Texas at Austin in the Cockrell School of Engineering departments of Mechanical Engineering and Electrical Engineering. During his tenure there, he continued his research on ionic conducting solids and electrochemical devices; he continued to study improved materials for batteries, aiming to promote the development of electric vehicles and to help reduce human dependency on fossil fuels. Arumugam Manthiram and Goodenough discovered the polyanion class of cathodes. They showed that positive electrodes containing polyanions, e.g., sulfates, produce higher voltages than oxides due to the inductive effect of the polyanion. The polyanion class includes materials such as lithium-iron phosphates that are used for smaller devices like power tools. His group also identified various promising electrode and electrolyte materials for solid oxide fuel cells. He held the Virginia H. Cockrell Centennial Chair in Engineering.

Goodenough still worked at the university at age 98 as of 2021, hoping to find another breakthrough in battery technology.

On February 28, 2017, Goodenough and his team at the University of Texas published a paper in the journal Energy and Environmental Science on their demonstration of a glass battery, a low-cost all-solid-state battery that is noncombustible and has a long cycle life with a high volumetric energy density, and fast rates of charge and discharge. Instead of liquid electrolytes, the battery uses glass electrolytes that enable the use of an alkali-metal anode without the formation of dendrites. However, this paper was met with widespread skepticism by the battery research community and remains controversial after several follow-up works. The work was criticized for a lack of comprehensive data, spurious interpretations of the data obtained, and that the proposed mechanism of battery operation would violate the first law of thermodynamics.

In April 2020, a patent was filed for the glass battery on behalf of Portugal's National Laboratory of Energy and Geology (LNEG), the University of Porto, Portugal, and the University of Texas.

=== Advisory work ===
In 2010, Goodenough joined the technical advisory board of Enevate, a silicon-dominant Li-ion battery technology startup based in Irvine, California. Goodenough also served as an adviser to the Joint Center for Energy Storage Research (JCESR), a collaboration led by Argonne National Laboratory and funded by the Department of Energy. From 2016, Goodenough also worked as an adviser for Battery500, a national consortium led by Pacific Northwest National Laboratory (PNNL) and partially funded by the U.S. Department of Energy.

== Distinctions and awards ==
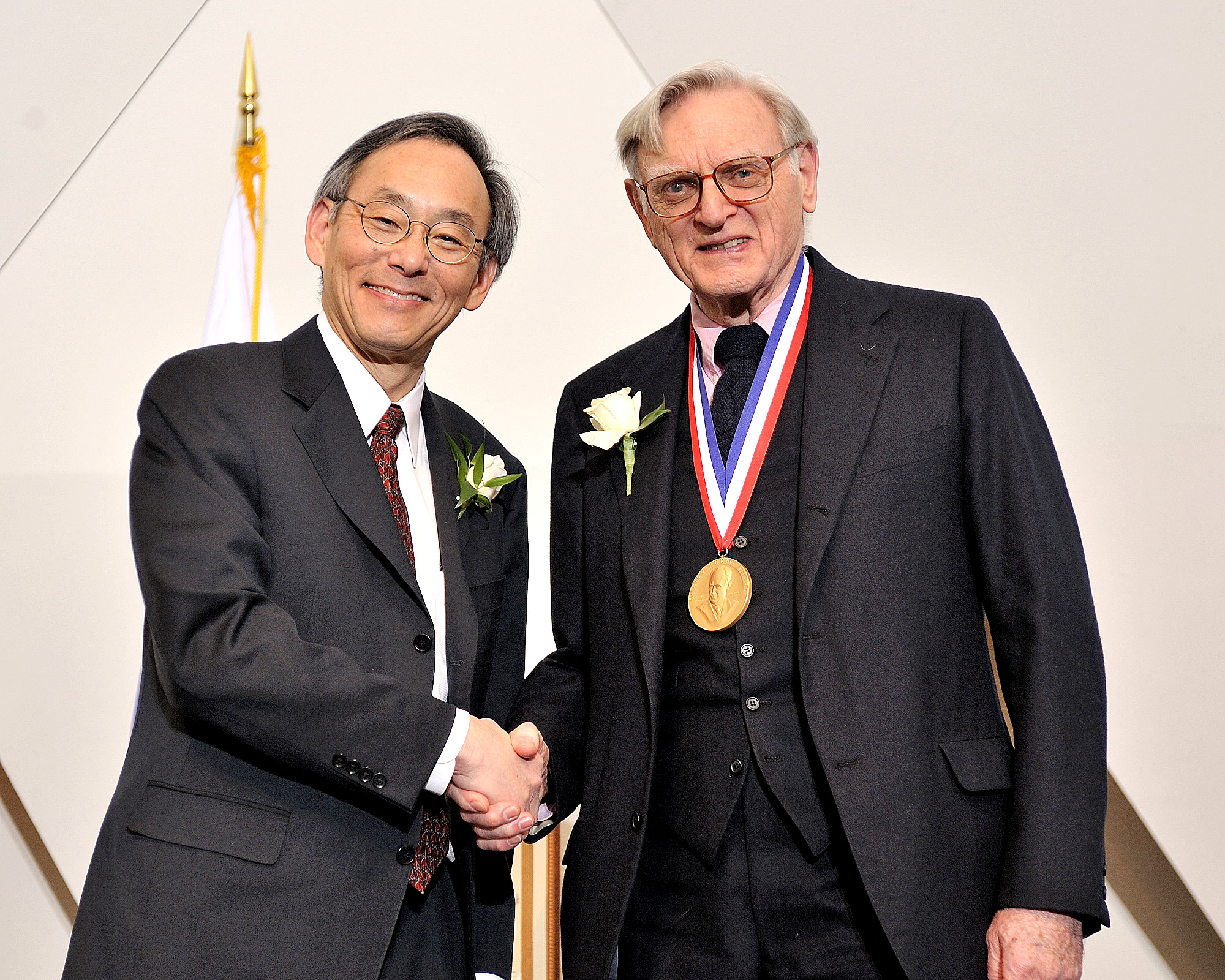
Goodenough receiving the 2009 Enrico Fermi Award from U.S. Energy Secretary Steven Chu.

Goodenough was elected a member of the National Academy of Engineering in 1976 for his work designing materials for electronic components and clarifying the relationships between the properties, structures, and chemistry of substances. He was also a member of the American National Academy of Sciences and its French, Spanish, and Indian counterparts. In 2010, he was elected a Foreign Member of the Royal Society. The Royal Society of Chemistry grants a John B. Goodenough Award in his honor. The Electrochemical Society awards a biannual John B. Goodenough Award of The Electrochemical Society.

Goodenough received the following awards:

- Fermi Award (2009), alongside metallurgist Siegfried Hecker
- National Medal of Science (2013), presented by U.S. President Barack Obama
- Draper Prize in engineering (2014).
- Welch Award in Chemistry (2017)
- C.K. Prahalad Award (2017)
- Copley Medal of the Royal Society (2019)
- Nobel Prize in Chemistry (2019), alongside M. Stanley Whittingham and Akira Yoshino

Goodenough was 97 when he received the Nobel Prize. He remains the oldest person ever to have been awarded the prize.

== Works ==
=== Selected articles ===
- John B. Goodenough (1955). "Theory of the role of covalence in the Perovskite-type Manganites [La, M(II)]MnO_{3}". Phys. Rev. 100 (2): 564–573. Bibcode:1955PhRv..100..564G. doi:10.1103/physrev.100.564.
- K. Mizushima; P.C. Jones; P.J. Wiseman; J.B. Goodenough (1980). "Li_{x}CoO_{2} (0<x<-1): A new cathode material for batteries of high energy density". Mater. Res. Bull. 15 (6): 783–799. doi:10.1016/0025-5408(80)90012-4. S2CID 97799722.
- John B. Goodenough (1985). B. Schuman, Jr.; et al. (eds.). "Manganese Oxides as Battery Cathodes" (PDF). Proceedings Symposium on Manganese Dioxide Electrode: Theory and Practice for Electrochemical Applications. 85–4. Re Electrochem. Soc. Inc, N.J.: 77–96.
- Lightfoot, P.; Pei, S. Y.; Jorgensen, J. D.; Manthiram, A.; Tang, X. X. & J. B. Goodenough. "Excess Oxygen Defects in Layered Cuprates", Argonne National Laboratory, The University of Texas-Austin, Materials Science Laboratory United States Department of Energy, National Science Foundation, (September 1990).
- Argyriou, D. N.; Mitchell, J. F.; Chmaissem, O.; Short, S.; Jorgensen, J. D. & J. B. Goodenough. "Sign Reversal of the Mn-O Bond Compressibility in La_{1.2}Sr_{1.8}Mn_{2}O_{7} Below T_{C}: Exchange Striction in the Ferromagnetic State", Argonne National Laboratory, The University of Texas-Austin, Center for Material Science and Engineering United States Department of Energy, National Science Foundation, Welch Foundation, (March 1997).
- A.K. Padhi; K.S. Nanjundaswamy; J.B. Goodenough (1997). "Phospho-Olivines as Positive Electrode Materials for Rechargeable Lithium Batteries" (PDF). J. Electrochem. Soc. 144 (4): 1188–1194. Bibcode:1997JElS..144.1188P. doi:10.1149/1.1837571. S2CID 97625881. Archived from the original (PDF) on July 23, 2018.
- John B. Goodenough (2004). "Electronic and ionic transport properties and other physical aspects of perovskites". Rep. Prog. Phys. 67 (11): 1915–1973. Bibcode:2004RPPh...67.1915G. doi:10.1088/0034-4885/67/11/R01. S2CID 250915186.
- Goodenough, J. B.; Abruna, H. D. & M. V. Buchanan. "Basic Research Needs for Electrical Energy Storage. Report of the Basic Energy Sciences Workshop on Electrical Energy Storage, April 2–4, 2007", United States Department of Energy, (April 4, 2007).
- "John B. Goodenough". Faculty. The University of Texas at Austin Mechanical Engineering Department. May 3, 2005. Archived from the original on September 28, 2011.

=== Selected books ===
- Goodenough, John B. (1976) [1963]. Magnetism and the Chemical Bond. Huntington, N.Y: Krieger. ISBN 0-88275-384-3.
- Goodenough, John B. (1973). Les oxydes des métaux de transition. Paris: Gauthier-Villars.
- Madelung, Otfried; Goodenough, John B. (1984). Physics of non-tetrahedrally bonded binary compounds 3. Berlin: Springer. ISBN 3-540-12744-5. OCLC 80307018.
- Goodenough, John B., ed. (1985). Cation ordering and electron transfer. Berlin: Springer. ISBN 3-540-15446-9. OCLC 12656638.
- Goodenough, John B., ed. (2001). Localized to Itinerant Electronic Transition in Perovskite Oxides (Structure & Bonding, V. 98) (PDF).
- Huang, Kevin; Goodenough, John B. (2009). Solid oxide fuel cell technology : principles, performance and operations. Cambridge, UK: Woodhead Publishing. ISBN 978-1-84569-651-1. OCLC 864716522.
- Goodenough, John B. (2008). Witness to Grace. PublishAmerica. ISBN 978-1-60474-767-6. OCLC 1058153653.

== See also ==
- Junjiro Kanamori
- Koichi Mizushima (scientist)
- Rachid Yazami
