= Electrochemical Society =

American chemistry organization

The Electrochemical Society
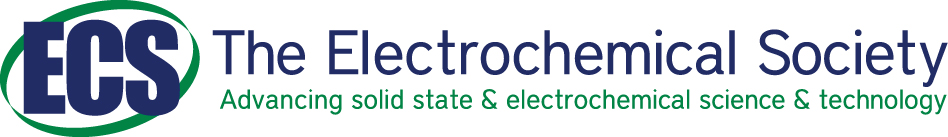
- Formation: 1902; 124 years ago
- Type: Scientific society
- Legal status: 501(c)(3) nonprofit organization
- Headquarters: Pennington, New Jersey
- Location: United States
- Members: 8,000
- Key people: Christopher J. Jannuzzi (Executive Director); Francis D'Souza (President)
- Website: electrochem.org

The Electrochemical Society is a learned society (professional association) based in the United States that supports scientific inquiry in the field of electrochemistry solid-state science and related technology. The Society membership comprises more than 8,000 scientists and engineers in over 85 countries at all degree levels and in all fields of electrochemistry, solid-state science and related technologies. Additional support is provided by institutional members including corporations and laboratories.

ECS is a 501(c)(3) non-profit organization.

The Society publishes numerous journals including the Journal of The Electrochemical Society (the oldest peer-reviewed journal in its field), the Journal of Solid State Science and Technology, ECS Meeting Abstracts, ECS Transactions, and ECS Interface. The Society sponsors the ECS Monographs Series. These distinguished monographs, published by John Wiley & Sons, are the leading textbooks in their fields.

The ECS Digital Library on IOPscience encompasses over 160,000 journal and magazine articles and meeting abstracts. The Society supports open access through the Society’s initiative to make research freely available to world readers and free for authors to publish.

The Society has thirteen topic interest area divisions as well as regional sections in Asia, Europe, Latin America, the Middle East, North America, and Southern Asia; over 100 ECS student chapters are located in major universities in all of these regions as well as Eastern Europe and South Africa. Student members benefit from exposure to experts in their fields, sharing research, volunteer activities, and career development.

ECS administers numerous international awards and supports STEM educational and outreach efforts.

== History ==
The Electrochemical Society was founded in 1902 in Philadelphia, PA. At the beginning, ECS was called the American Electrochemical Society.

The 19th century saw many applications of electricity to chemical processes and chemical understanding. Bridging the gap between electrical engineering and chemistry led people in industrial and academic circles to search for a new forum to discuss developments in the burgeoning field of electrochemistry.

The original constitution of the Society called for holding meetings and publishing papers presented there and the ensuing discussions. In 1902 the Society ushered in a new publication, Transactions of the American Electrochemical Society. In 1907 the first “local” section was formed at the University of Wisconsin. That same year, the American Electrochemical Society Bulletin was launched; it became the Journal of The Electrochemical Society in 1948.

In the 1920s, topical interest area divisions began to be founded, including the High Temperature Materials Division and the Electrodeposition Division. In 1930, the international nature of the Society was officially recognized by dropping “American” from the name. A new category of membership was started in 1941 to permit industrial companies to support the Society’s mission. ECS began fulfilling the need for critical textbooks with the publication of its second monograph, the Corrosion Handbook, by H. H. Uhlig in 1948.

Throughout the latter half of the 20th century, the Society continued to grow in size and importance, expanding the number of its publications, and the significance of the technical research unveiled at its meetings.

Over time, the Society’s members and publications’ authors have included many distinguished scientists and engineers. The Society’s original charter members included:

- E. G. Acheson, who commercialized carborundum, an artificial graphite;
- H. H. Dow, the founder of Dow Chemical Company;
- C. M. Hall, the inventor of the Hall process for the manufacture of aluminum;
- Edward Weston, the founder of Weston Instruments.

Thomas A. Edison joined the Society in 1903 and enjoyed membership for 28 years. In 1965, Gordon Moore's seminal prediction, Moore's Law, developed its roots within the Society. ECS has included numerous Nobel laureates among its members, most recently the three co-winners of the 2019 Nobel Prize in Chemistry. John B. Goodenough, M. Stanley Whittingham, and Akira Yoshino shared the prize “for the development of lithium-ion batteries.”

== Meetings ==
The Society has hosted scientific technical meetings since 1902 including its biannual meetings in the spring and fall of each year.

== Publications ==
ECS publishes peer-reviewed technical journals, proceedings, monographs, conference abstracts, and a quarterly news magazine.

=== Journals ===
Since 1902, the Society has published journals now available through ECS’s publishing partner.

=== Journal History ===
Several ECS journals which have ceased publication are now preserved as an archive. These archived publications are available through the Digital Library.

=== ECS Books & Monographs ===
- Electrochemical Society Monograph Series

ECS Monographs provide accounts on specific topics in electrochemistry and solid-state science and technology. Since the 1940s, ECS and publishers have cooperated to publish titles in these fields.

=== Journal of The Electrochemical Society ===
JES is the flagship journal of The Electrochemical Society. Published continuously from 1902 to the present, JES is one of the most highly-cited journals in electrochemistry and solid-state science and technology.

=== ECS Journal of Solid State Science and Technology ===
JSS is a peer-reviewed journal covering fundamental and applied areas of solid-state science and technology, including experimental and theoretical aspects of the chemistry and physics of materials and devices.

=== ECS Interface ===
The Electrochemical Society Interface is a publication for those in the field of solid-state and electrochemical science and technology. Published quarterly, this four-color magazine contains technical articles about the latest developments in the field and presents news and information about and for Society members.

=== ECS Meetings Abstracts ===
ECS Meeting Abstracts contain extended abstracts of the technical papers presented at the ECS biannual meetings and ECS-sponsored meetings. This publication offers a first look into current research in the field. ECS Meeting Abstracts are freely available to all visitors to the ECS Digital Library.

=== ECS Transactions ===
ECST is the official conference proceedings publication of The Electrochemical Society. This publication features full-text content of proceedings from ECS meetings and ECS-sponsored meetings. The papers appearing in ECST are reviewed to ensure that submissions meet generally accepted scientific standards.

=== ECS Meeting Abstracts ===
ECS Meeting Abstracts contain extended abstracts of the technical papers presented at the ECS biannual meetings and ECS-sponsored meetings. This publication offers a first look into current research in the field. ECS Meeting Abstracts are freely available to all visitors to the ECS Digital Library.

== Educational activities and programs ==
=== Awards ===
The society recognizes members for outstanding technical achievement in electrochemical and solid-state science and technology at various career levels. It also recognizes exceptional service to the Society. This is done through the ECS Honors & Awards Program—international awards, medals, and other prizes administered by the Society.

Starting in 1919, Honorary Membership was bestowed for outstanding contributions to the Society. ECS's most prestigious award, the Edward Goodrich Acheson Award, established in 1928, is presented in even-numbered years for "conspicuous contribution to the advancement of the objectives, purposes, and activities of the society".

Supporting students and early career scientists has been a long-held goal of The Electrochemical Society. The Norman Hackerman Young Author Award —established in 1928—is one of the first awards created by the Society. It is given for the best paper published in the Journal of The Electrochemical Society that year by a young author or co-authors. Recipients must be under 31 years of age. Among the significant talents recognized at an early age by this award is Nobel laureate, M. Stanley Whittingham, who received it in 1970.

The Olin Palladium Award (formerly the Palladium Medal Award), established in 1950, is presented in odd-numbered years to recognize "distinguished contributions to the field of electrochemical or corrosion science."

ECS honors members with the designation, Fellow of The Electrochemical Society for having made significant accomplishments to the fields of electrochemistry and solid state science and technology, and to the Society.

The Vittorio de Nora Award was established in 1971 to recognize distinguished contributions to the field of electrochemical engineering and technology.

=== Fellowships and grants ===
Through competitive fellowship stipends, ECS supports students and young professionals as they pursue new ideas and forge connections with professionals both within and outside the field.

== Notable members ==
Notable members of The Electrochemical Society include numerous Nobel Prize laureates including the three co-winners of the 2019 Nobel Prize for Chemistry.

- Thomas Edison: Edison became a member on April 4, 1903. Early members recall attending a meeting at Edison's home in the Society’s early days. Edison is often credited for inventing the phonograph, the motion picture camera, and the electric light bulb.
- John B. Goodenough, M. Stanley Whittingham, and Akira Yoshino, all long-time ECS members, shared the 2019 Nobel Prize in Chemistry “for the development of lithium-ion batteries”.
- Isamu Akasaki, Hiroshi Amano, and Shuji Nakamura shared the 2014 Nobel Prize in Physics for “the invention of efficient blue light-emitting diodes, which has enabled bright and energy-saving white light sources”.
- Jack Kilby’s invention of the integrated circuit earned him half of the 2000 Nobel Prize in Physics "for basic work on information and communication technology".
- Steven Chu and William D. Phillips were co-recipients of the 1997 Nobel Prize in Physics “for the development of methods to cool and trap atoms with laser light”.
- Richard Smalley shared the 1996 Nobel Prize in Chemistry “for the discovery of fullerenes”.
- Rudolph A. Marcus won the 1992 Nobel Prize in Chemistry “for his contributions to the theory of electron transfer reactions in chemical systems".
- Jean-Marie Lehn, an early innovator in the field of supramolecular chemistry, shared the 1987 Nobel Prize in Chemistry “for the development and use of molecules with structure-specific interactions of high selectivity”.
- Gerd Binnig shared the 1986 Nobel Prize in Physics “for the design of the scanning tunneling microscope”.
- Charles W. Tobias: A pioneer in the field of electrochemical engineering, Tobias made a long-lasting and far-reaching impact on the field of electrochemical science by forming the Chemical Engineering Department at UC Berkeley in 1947. He served as ECS president from 1970-1971.
- Gordon E. Moore: The co-founder of Intel was known for his 1965 principle which made possible the delivery of more powerful and lower-costing semiconductor chips. This was later known as Moore's law.
- Norman Hackerman: The internationally known expert in metal corrosion served as ECS president from 1957-1958. Hackerman is most recognized for developing the electrochemistry of oxidation.
- Carl Wagner: Often referred to as the father of solid-state chemistry, Wagner's work on oxidation rate theory, counter diffusion of ions, and defect chemistry considerably advanced knowledge of how reactions proceed at the atomic level in the solid state. Wagner was the first recipient of the ECS Palladium Award in 1951.
- Irving Langmuir: received the 1932 Nobel Prize in Chemistry “for his discoveries and investigations in surface chemistry”.
- Edward Goodrich Acheson: The inventor of the Acheson process was a manufacturer of carborundum and graphite. The ECS Acheson Award was named in his honor in 1931.
- Theodore William Richards: Richards, whose research helped confirm the existence of isotopes, received the 1914 Nobel Prize in Chemistry, “in recognition of his accurate determinations of the atomic weight of a large number of chemical elements”.
- Willis R. Whitney: ECS president from 1911-1912, Whitney is most recognized among his many achievements for founding the research laboratory of the General Electric Company.
- Leo Baekeland: Baekeland, who served as ECS president in 1909, is most famous for inventing Bakelite in 1907. His entrepreneurial genius and inventive nature made Baekeland one of the most important players in chemical technology.
- Herbert H. Dow: Among his most significant achievements, Dow founded the Dow Chemical Company in 1897. Dow Chemical funded the creation of the ECS Industrial Electrochemistry and Electrochemical Engineering Division H. H. Dow Memorial Student Achievement Award in his honor in 1990.
- Edward Weston: Noted for his achievements in electroplating, Weston developed the electrochemical cell – named the Weston cell, for the voltage standard.
- Charles Martin Hall: Hall, is best known for inventing an inexpensive process to produce aluminum, was one of the founders of Alcoa.
- Lawrence Addicks (1878-1964) served as president of The Electrochemical Society from 1915 to 1916.
