= 2025 Canadian honours =

Canadian government recognitions

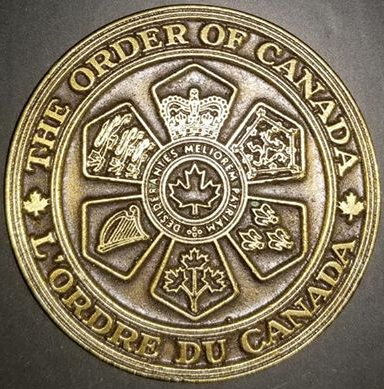
The Seal of the Order of Canada

The following are the appointments to various Canadian Honours of 2025. Usually, they are announced as part of the New Year and Canada Day celebrations and are published within the Canada Gazette during year. This follows the custom set out within the United Kingdom which publishes its appoints of various British Honours for New Year's and for monarch's official birthday. However, instead of the midyear appointments announced on Victoria Day, the official birthday of the Canadian Monarch, this custom has been transferred with the celebration of Canadian Confederation and the creation of the Order of Canada.

However, as the Canada Gazette publishes appointment to various orders, decorations and medal, either Canadian or from Commonwealth and foreign states, this article will reference all Canadians so honoured during the 2025 calendar year.

Provincial Honours are not listed within the Canada Gazette, however they are listed within the various publications of each provincial government. Provincial honours are listed within the page.

The first appointments to the Order of Canada were announced on 18 December 2024.

More appointments were announced during the year.

All listed postnominals are postnominals held by a person immediately prior to their appointment to a given order.

== The Order of Canada ==
=== Companions of the Order of Canada ===
Undress ribbon of a Companion of the Order of Canada

- Pierre Boivin OC CQ (This is a promotion within the Order)
- W. Ford Doolittle
- Hon. John Paul Manley PC OC (This is a promotion within the Order)

=== Officer of the Order of Canada ===
Undress ribbon of an Officer of the Order of Canada

- Stephen Aaron Arshinoff
- Sylvia Beth Bashevkin
- Zulfiqar Ahmed Bhutta
- Ronald Frank Burnett CM OBC (This is a promotion within the Order)
- Stan Douglas
- Dafna Debora Gladman
- Carlton Lloyd Gyles
- Nada Jabado
- Maureen Ann Jennings
- Dominique Alice Lemieux (deceased)
- Randy Lennox
- Tania Murray Li
- Marco Antonio Marra OBC
- David Richard McCann
- Jeffrey John McDonnell
- Derek Muir
- Stanley Nattel
- General Walter John Natynczyk CMM MSC CD (retired)
- Lesley E. Paulette
- Heather Rankin
- Ryan Reynolds OBC
- Christiane Rousseau OQ
- Tricia Catherine Smith CM (This is a promotion within the Order)
- George A. Trusler OOnt
- Fabrice Pierre Brunet
- Tom Tak Kin Chau OOnt MSC
- Alan Charles Evans
- Cheryl Forchuk OOnt
- F. Stuart Foster
- Donald William Hayley
- Bonnie J. Fraser Henry OBC
- David Alexander Jones
- Maureen Anne McTeer
- John Theodore Nolan OOnt
- Peter Leon Rosenbaum
- Saroj Saigal
- Adel S. Sedra OOnt
- Mike Stevens OOnt
- Theresa Tam
- Miriam Toews OM
- David Norman Weisstub
- Tonya Williams
- Karim Zaghib

=== Members of the Order of Canada ===
Undress ribbon for a Member of the Order of Canada

- Ruth Elsie Abernethy
- Donald Alder
- Vincent Asselin CQ
- Orland Arthur Backstrom
- Louise A. MacCallum and Michael A. Barnstijn
- Barry Kenneth Blanchard
- John Anthony Boeckh
- Nicole Bourque-Bouchier
- Maureen Constance Boyd
- Sandy Howard Buchman
- James Kevin Cameron
- David A. Chitayat
- Stacy Churchill
- Colin Roswell Clarke
- Fabienne Colas
- Felix J. E. Comeau
- Carol Ann Cowan-Levine
- Donald A. Dippo
- Mariette Doduck
- Laurent Duvernay-Tardif CQ
- Morna Edmundson
- Roy Douglas Elliott
- Pyarali Gulamani Nanji
- Pinchas Gutter
- Daniel A. Haas
- Aura Kagan
- Jean-Pierre Kingsley
- Isolde Lagacé
- André Bernard Lalonde
- Jeanne Brigitte Lehman
- Karen Levine
- John Donald Longhurst
- Irving Ludmer
- Lorin Jean MacDonald OOnt
- Kevin Ray Martin
- Louis Ménard
- Kenneth Leslie Mould
- Wendy Muckle
- Steve Murphy
- Vijayakumar Murty
- Scott Oake OM
- Barbara Jean Perry
- Diane Marie Pitre
- Michael J. Prince
- Julia Berger Reitman
- Bernard Paul Richard
- Richard Rose
- Greg Ryan
- Chloé Sainte-Marie
- Guy Saint-Jacques OQ
- Walter Schneider
- Joseph A. Schwarcz
- Charles Clayton Scott
- Sam D. Shemie
- Diane Patricia Helen Sims
- Valerie Sue Tarasuk
- Tirajeh Tehranchian
- Gabriel David Tuccaro
- Jean Turmel
- Ajay K. Virmani
- Allan Douglas George Wade
- Mark Zuehlke
- Bruce Alexander Anderson
- Ronald Bisson
- Marc-André Blanchard
- Earl Raphael Bogoch
- Jacques Bouchard
- Ronald Joseph Bourgeois ONS
- Jackson Maurice Brodsky SOM
- Brian Bronfman OQ
- Freda Lang Browns
- Alexandra Bugailiskis
- Roy Keith Byram OY
- Donald Wilfred Campbell
- Michel Cardin
- Brian Anthony Crane KC
- Colonel-Maître Michel William Drapeau OMM CD
- Marianne Dubuc
- Allison Audrey Eddy
- Elizabeth Rollins Epperly
- Kent Farndale
- Robert Thomas Foster AOE
- Albert David Friesen OM
- Élise Gravel
- Lorraine Greaves
- Sky Dancer Louise Bernice Halfe
- Kenneth Wayne Hindmarsh
- Paul Hindo CD
- Thomas Peter Caven Irving
- Milton Israel
- Donald Albert James
- Ruth Louise James MSC
- Robert R. Janes
- Miloš J. Krajny
- Nathan Leon Leipciger MSM
- Barry Frederick Lorenzetti
- Stephen B. Lucas
- Hon. J. Michael MacDonald ONS
- Sylvain Martel CD
- Claudette McGowan
- Michael Kevin McMahon
- Ashleigh Bernard Molloy
- Kathy Mulder
- Glenn Kevin Murphy
- Jacques Parisien
- David F. Pelly CD
- Susan Peterson d’Aquino
- Vincenzo Pietropaolo
- Michel Rabagliati CQ
- George Elliot Rodger
- Sharon Diane Brown Ross
- Ebonnie Rowe
- Hon. Robert William Runciman OOnt
- Roderick Raymond Senft
- Mahesh Chandra Sharma
- Georges St-Pierre
- Chris G. Tambakis
- Hon. Claudette Tardif AOE
- Homer Chin-nan Tien OMM CD
- Gilbert Donald Walsh
- Greg Wells
- Timothy Joseph Whelan
- Stephen Adrian White (This is an honorary appointment)
- Ruth Doreen Williams OBC

== Order of Military Merit ==
=== Commanders of the Order of Military Merit ===
Undress ribbon for a Commander of the Order of Military Merit

- Major-General Derek Alan Macaulay OMM MSM CD (This is a promotion within the Order)
- Brigadier-General Jamie Ruth Speiser-Blanchet CD
- Rear-Admiral Steven Michael Waddell MSM CD
- Major-General Scott Francis Malcolm MSC CD
- Major-General Jacques Paul Robert Prévost OMM MSC MSM CD (This is a promotion within the order)
- Major-General Peter Kenneth Scott CD

=== Officers of the Order of Military Merit ===
Undress ribbon for an Officer of the Order of Military Merit

- Lieutenant-Colonel Nathalie Yolande Birgentzlen CD
- Lieutenant-Colonel Jennifer Anne Causey CD
- Colonel Alain Aaron Cohen CD
- Colonel Brendan Stirling Cook MSM CD
- Colonel Daniel Stewart Coutts CD
- Colonel Sarah Anne Heer MSM CD
- Colonel Christopher James Horner CD
- Lieutenant-Colonel David Glen Jones CD ADC
- Colonel Robert Walter McBride MSM CD
- Lieutenant-Colonel Raymond Daniel Trudel CD
- Colonel Marie Bernadette Martha Geneviève Bertrand CD
- Captain(N) Todd William Bonnar MSC CD
- Major Suleyman Demiray CD
- Lieutenant-Colonel Richard Garon CD
- Colonel Cher Larissa Goulet CD
- Colonel Donald Roy Henley MSM CD
- Brigadier-General Leighton Lascelle Jonathan James CD
- Lieutenant-Colonel Stephanie Christiana LeBlanc CD
- Colonel Christopher Wayne Morrison MSC CD
- Lieutenant-Colonel William Russell Gus Patton CD
- Colonel Frédéric Claude Pruneau CD
- Lieutenant-Colonel Mark Andrew Sheppard CD
- Lieutenant-Colonel Chung Leung Wong CD

=== Members of the Order of Military Merit ===
Undress ribbon for a Member of the Order of Military Merit

- Chief Warrant Officer Nicolas Patrick Beaupré CD
- Chief Warrant Officer François Gerald Bernier CD
- Master Warrant Officer Aaron Matthew Bowes CD
- Warrant Officer Christopher Gary Bradley CD
- Warrant Officer Karel Jérôme Brault CD
- Captain Mélanie Marie Eve Isabelle Brault CD
- Petty Officer 1st Class Mathieu Michel Sylvain Marc-André Brunelle CD
- Master Warrant Officer Stephane Caillie CD
- Master Warrant Officer Rodney George Colbourne CD
- Master Warrant Officer Martin Trevor Cook CD
- Chief Warrant Officer Philippe Normand Cousineau CD
- Ranger Florence Elaine Cyprean CD
- Warrant Officer Samantha Rae Dean CD
- Captain Alan Doucet CD
- Chief Warrant Officer Marc Yvan Drolet CD
- Chief Warrant Officer Cyrille Sacha Dubé CD
- Sergeant Mélanie Marie Micheline Duchesneau CD
- Chief Warrant Officer Jonathan Hareton Ellis CD
- Ranger Betsy Epoo CD
- Chief Warrant Officer Yann Gauthier CD
- Master Warrant Officer Gordon Paul Harris CD
- Master Warrant Officer Alexander Adam Herman CD
- Ranger Roger Hitkolok CD
- Captain Elisa Jean Holland CD
- Master Warrant Officer Benjamin Emile Holmes CD
- Chief Warrant Officer Scott Thomas Eugene Howell MSM CD
- Master Warrant Officer Eric Joseph Fernand Jobin CD
- Chief Warrant Officer Thomas-Louis Charles Philippe Laforest CD
- Sergeant Adriana Magdalena Laing CD
- Chief Warrant Officer Raymond Noel Laplante CD
- Warrant Officer Marie-Hélène Mélanie Nicole Lavoie CD
- Sergeant Ryan William Reginald Joseph McHugh CD
- Captain Sarah Carroll McRae CD
- Sergeant Robert Nederlof CD
- Master Warrant Officer Eric Joseph Dominique Néron CD
- Warrant Officer Lisa Annette O'Dell CD
- Master Warrant Officer Shawn Paul Pomeroy CD
- Master Warrant Officer Damien Lindsey Robison MSC CD
- Warrant Officer Bruno Joseph Simon Jacques Guy Robitaille MSM CD
- Chief Petty Officer 2nd Class Amy Lynne Rooney CD
- Master Warrant Officer Marc-André Joseph Moïse Rousseau MMV CD
- Chief Warrant Officer Roger Allan Ian Shaver CD
- Sergeant Andy St-Louis CD
- Warrant Officer May Georgena Phyllis Susut CD
- Ranger John Sutherland CD
- Chief Warrant Officer Dany Joseph Eddy Vallerand CD
- Ranger Redfern George Wesley CD
- Master Warrant Officer Timothy George Wiebe .CD
- Master Warrant Officer Carl Ryan Wolfe CD
- Master Warrant Officer Bernard Gordon Antle CD
- Master Warrant Officer Curtis Edward Bamford CD
- Sergeant Marie Claire Claudia Baril Germain CD
- Master Warrant Officer Joanne Patricia Bedard CD
- Ranger Michael Mark Belanger CD
- Ranger Robert Gerard Benoit CD
- Chief Warrant Officer Stacey Horne Blackmore CD
- Chief Warrant Officer Marie Françoise Sandra Bouchard CD
- Warrant Officer Candy Fleur-des-Neiges Chapados CD
- Chief Warrant Officer Sean Courtney Chase CD
- Chief Petty Officer 1st Class Steven Craig Clark CD
- Chief Petty Officer 2nd Class William Gregory Lyndon Crocker CD
- Warrant Officer Philippe Michel Pierre Dalphond CD
- Captain François Dorion CD
- Master Warrant Officer Randy Anthony Dowden CD
- Master Warrant Officer Matthew Joseph David Flynn CD
- Warrant Officer Marie Michelle Fortin Fontaine CD
- Chief Warrant Officer Richard Joseph René Francoeur CD
- Master Warrant Officer Nicholas Joseph Gallant CD
- Master Warrant Officer Karl Joseph Simon Pascal Giguère CD
- Captain Jan-Marie Gill CD
- Sergeant Marie-Pier Grimard-Bérubé CD
- Warrant Officer Mario Joseph Yvon Larocque CD
- Master Warrant Officer Simon Lavoie CD
- Master Corporal Oliver Lim Fet Lee CD
- Chief Warrant Officer Sean Colin MacEachern CD
- Master Sailor Rachel Rose McCarthy CD
- Chief Warrant Officer Sean Andrew McGowan CD
- Master Warrant Officer Sibylle Michel CD
- Master Warrant Officer Clinton John Orr MMV CD
- Warrant Officer James William Palmer CD
- Chief Warrant Officer Jeremy Robert Peters CD
- Warrant Officer Anny Marie Luce Piché-Montplaisir CD
- Petty Officer 2nd Class Annie Marie France Poirier CD
- Chief Petty Officer 2nd Class Allison Michelle Reid CD
- Master Warrant Officer Joseph Gilles Gaétan St-Laurent CD
- Warrant Officer Lawrence Henry Teichrib CD
- Chief Warrant Officer Joseph David Emile Tessier CD
- Captain Jonathan Steven Thibeault CD
- Chief Warrant Officer Christian Thomassin MSM CD
- Chief Petty Officer 2nd Class Michael Robert Tibbetts CD
- Corporal Mathieaiaparanam Wakisan CD
- Master Warrant Officer Kevin Donald Scott White MSM CD
- Master Warrant Officer Deborah Dawn Yaxley CD

== Order of Merit of the Police Forces ==
=== Commander of the Order of Merit of the Police Forces ===
Undress ribbon of a Commander of the Order of Merit of the Police Forces

=== Officers of the Order of Merit of the Police Forces ===
Undress ribbon of an Officer of the Order of Merit of the Police Forces

- Deputy Chief Brian Bigras
- John William Burchill MOM (This is a promotion within the Order)
- Deputy Chief Paul Cook MOM (This is a promotion within the Order)
- Frédérick Gaudreau MOM (This is a promotion within the Order)
- Andrea Lamothe
- Chief Constable Delbir ‘’Del’’ Singh Manak MOM (This is a promotion within the Order)
- Assistant Commissioner William Yun-Ming Ng MSM
- Deputy Commissioner Curtis Michael Zablocki MOM (This is a promotion within the Order)
- Chief Peacekeeper Dwayne Zacharie MOM (This is a promotion within the Order)

=== Members of the Order of Merit of the Police Forces ===
Undress ribbon of a Member of the Order of Merit of the Police Forces

- Deputy Chief Alvaro Almeida
- Superintendent Ryan C. Ayliffe
- Inspector Marcel Beaudin
- Superintendent Susan Biggs
- Constable John Cerasuolo
- Superintendent Andrew Chan
- Superintendent Don Chapman
- Chief Superintendent Dave Chauhan
- Deputy Chief Sara Cunningham
- Director Fady Dagher
- Brent Dyer
- Patrol Sergeant Jason Brent English MMM CD
- Chief Scott W. Feener
- Deputy Chief Patricia Ferguson
- Inspector Veronica S.E. Fox
- Detective Inspector Joseph Lee Fulford
- Inspector Thomas Hickey
- Deputy Chief Jeff Hill
- Deputy Chief Paul James Hyland
- Inspector Feras Ismail
- Staff Sergeant Frank Jang
- Barbara Joan Jensen
- Detective Inspector Robert Johnston
- Constable Eric Alexander Jordan
- Constable Matt Jotham
- Gregory P. Kratzig
- Inspector James D. Lamothe CD
- Acting Staff Sergeant Walter John Lushman CD
- Superintendent Kevin Maher
- Inspector Murray Michael Marcichiw
- Inspector Julie Marcotte
- Director Paul McDougall
- Sergeant Mark Alan McKinnell
- Superintendent Wendy Mehat
- Sergeant Peter G. Merrifield
- Superintendent Imran Jamil Mirza
- Inspector Dawn Morris-Little
- Inspector Kimberly Mueller
- Chief Superintendent Teddy William Munro
- Inspector Andrea Ninacs
- Superintendent Kimberley O'Toole
- Kellie Paquette
- Assistant Commissioner Michele D. Paradis
- Superintendent Jeffrey Leonard Pelley
- Inspector Roshan J. Pinto
- Sergeant Michael Ross Pollard
- Superintendent Darren R. Pringle CD
- Superintendent Asif Rashid
- Assistant Commissioner Sorab D. Rupa
- Inspector Tricia Rupert
- Superintendent Jeffrey Sandy
- Sergeant Steven Schmelzle
- Superintendent Darren Schneider
- Superintendent Domenic Sinopoli
- Inspector Perry Smith
- Corporal Jennifer Sue Sparkes
- Director Thierry Vallières
- Inspector Adrienne Vickery
- Staff Sergeant Darrin Wayne Young
- Chief Superintendent James Robert Zettler

== Sovereign's Medal for Volunteers ==
Ribbon of the Sovereign's Medal for Volunteers

- Rosana Kit-Shuen Auyang
- Vickram Bachan
- Matthew Barrett
- Commander John Alexander Bell (Ret’d)
- Lieutenant-Colonel Richard Franck Bialachowski (Ret’d)
- Jean Bilodeau
- Captain Ashley Ann Evelyn Bonnell
- Amandeep K. Boparai
- Lieutenant-Colonel Pierre Bruneau OMM CD (Ret’d)
- Diane Maureen Anderson Campbell
- John Donald Campbell
- Mary Christie
- André Courchesne
- Mary-Jo Dionne
- Sean Michael Donohue
- Jean-Yves Doucet
- Barbara Mae DuMoulin
- Brian Vincent Duncalfe
- Geoffrey Robert Ellis
- Lylia Essaddam
- John Estrella
- Monique Fournier
- Carmen Gagnon
- Michel Gagnon
- John Glover
- Peter Blyth Gower
- Robert Bruce Ellis Hallsor KC
- Jacques Hamel
- Sandra Gwen Hamm
- Robert J. Harper
- Frederick Hughes Hayward
- Darrell Helyar
- Lavender Naomi Himech (K’Sim T’sm Laxha)
- Lilian Howick
- Maurice-Pierre André Joanis
- Brenda Lee Jones
- Ieuan Jones-Ashton
- Annick Kwetcheu Gamo
- Odette M. Lacroix
- Norie Manansala Blohm
- Jacques Frederick Marc
- William Jonathan James McArthur
- Hélène Michaud
- Warrant Officer Ryan Mitchell CD (Ret'd)
- David M. Moore
- Lieutenant Ryan Moore
- Gregory Allan Nix
- Hélène Pagé-Riddell
- Gilles Paquet
- Janet Elaine Paquet
- Wendy Quinn
- Lorna Eileen Scheschuk
- Chantal Simard
- Katharine Smyth
- Rocco Speranza
- Monika Spolia
- Jenniefer Victoria Stronge
- Lisette Tremblay
- Honorary Colonel Luc Vandal
- Myles Vanni
- Danilo Antonio Velasquez
