= International Network of Women Engineers and Scientists =

Network for women professionals in engineering

International Network of Women Engineers and Scientists (INWES) is a current network for women professionals, which was founded in 2002 with the intention to support women and girls in engineering and science across the world. The current (2020–2023) President is Jung Sun Kim, from Dongseo University, South Korea.

According to their mission statement, the network seeks to encourage the education and retention of professional women in these fields through international collaboration. The founding of the network received support from UNESCO. Founding members include Canadian engineers Claire Deschênes, Monique Frize and Gail Mattson, current Immediate Past President of INWES and past president of SWE, Society of Women Engineers, USA. The network currently has over 60 countries involved, including the Association of Korean Women Scientists and Engineers, Women's Engineering Society (UK), the German Association of Women Engineers (DIB), the Society of Taiwan Women in Science and Technology (TWiST) and African Women in Science and Engineering (AWSE).

== Management of the International Conference of Women Engineers and Scientists ==
The network took over the management of the International Conference of Women Engineers and Scientists (ICWES), which first took place in 1964 in New York and has met every 3–4 years since then. ICWES serves as a meeting point for women practitioners in science and engineering from across the world. Since INWES took over the management of the conference, it has taken place in Ottawa, Canada (2002); Seoul, Korea (2005); Lille, France (2008); Adelaide, Australia (2011); Los Angeles, USA (2014); and New Delhi, India (2017). ICWES 18 will take place in Coventry, UK, in 2021.

== INWES archives ==
The archives of INWES are held in the University of Ottawa Archives and Special Collections.

== INWES Education and Research Institute ==
The Education and Research Institute (INWES-ERI) was formed in November 2007 as a charitable organization incorporated in Canada and registered as a Canadian Charitable organization in February 2008. INWES-ERI was created to advance education in the fields of science, technology, engineering and mathematics (STEM) and to expand the reach of INWES through funding of special projects. In 2018, INWES-ERI along with the University of Ottawa Library and Library and Archives Canada, launched the Canadian Archive of Women in STEM (CAWSTEM). The idea began with a workshop held at the University of Ottawa on September 11 and 12, 2014 organized by Monique Frize, Claire Deschênes, and Ruby Heap. CAWSTEM's goals are to increase awareness and access to archival material in Canada, to encourage women in STEM to donate their records to an archive, and ensuring that the story of women's accomplishments in STEM is not lost for future researchers. In 2019, INWES-ERI was renamed to CIWES-IFCIS.
