= Boulet =

Boulet may refer to:

- Boulet (surname)
- Boulet (comics), pseudonym of the French comic book artist Gilles Roussel
- Le Boulet, a French action-comedy film
- Bouleț, a river in Romania

== See also ==
- Prix Lionel-Boulet, Prix du Québec award for researchers
- Rue des Boulets station, a Paris Metro station
- Viyé-l'-Boulet, Walloon name for a village spelt Villers-le-Bouillet in French
