= Emily Elliott =

Emily Elliott may refer to:

- Emily Elliott (1893–1983) of the Elliott sisters, Irish nationalist
- Emily Elliott (scientist) Professor at the University of Pittsburgh
- Emily Louise Orr Elliott (1867–1952), Canadian artist and fashion designer
- E. S. Elliott (Emily Steele Elliott) (1836–1897), English religious writer
