= Frize =

Frize is a surname. Notable people with the surname include:

- Bernard Frize (born 1949), French painter
- Monique Frize (born 1942), Canadian academic and biomedical engineer
