= Carol Kendall =

Carol Kendall may refer to

- Carol Kendall (writer) (1917–2012), writer of children's books
- Carol Kendall (scientist), scientist at United States Geological Survey

== See also ==
- Carroll Kendall (1890–1975), Canadian ice hockey player
