= Bouley (surname) =

Bouley is a French surname.

== List of people with the surname ==
- Bernard Bouley (born 1950), French politician
- David Bouley (1953–2024), American chef

== See also ==
- Bosley (surname)
- Boulet (surname)
- Bouley
- Bouley Bay
- Bouley Bay Hill Climb
