= Ruby Heap =

Canadian historian and academic

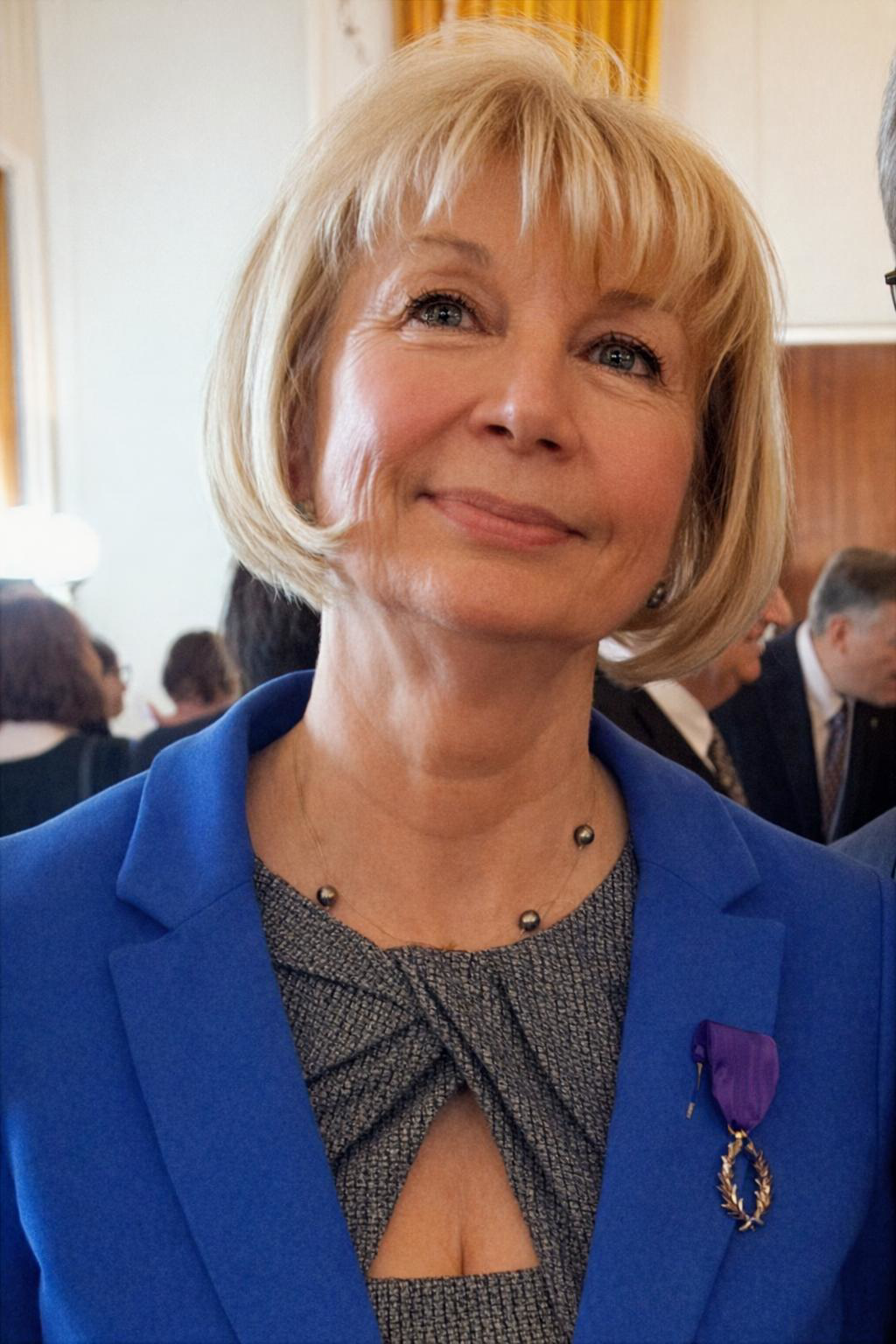
- Ruby Heap on receiving Ordre des Palmes académiques (2017)
- Born: Montréal, Québec
- Education: McGill University; Université de Montréal
- Occupations: Canadian historian and academic
- Employer: University of Ottawa
- Known for: History of women in the professions (education, science and engineering)
- Awards: Ursula Franklin Award (Royal Society of Canada); Ordre des Palmes académiques
- Website: Official site

Ruby Heap (born 1955) is a Canadian historian and academic specializing in the history of women, gender, science, engineering, and technology. She is Professor Emerita of History at the University of Ottawa and is known for her research on the history of women in engineering and science in Canada. In recognition of her lifetime contributions to furthering understanding of issues concerning gender, she was awarded the 2018 Ursula Franklin Award by the Royal Society of Canada.

== Early life and education ==
Ruby was born in Montreal in 1955. She earned a BA and an MA in History from McGill University in 1976 and 1979, respectively. Early on, her research interests focused on the history of education in Quebec, more specifically the role of the church and state in education in the late 19^{th} and early 20^{th} century. Heap completed her master’s thesis (L'église, l'état et l'éducation au Québec, 1875-1898) under the supervision of Laurier Lapierre. In 1986, Heap completed a PhD in History at Université de Montréal under the supervision of Michel Brunet (from 1979 until his death in 1985) and René Durocher, thereafter (L’Église, l’état et l’enseignement primaire public catholique au Québec 1897-1920).

== Academic career and scholarship ==
Heap joined the University of Ottawa in 1988 as a faculty member in the Department of History. She taught undergraduate and graduate courses in women’s history and Canadian history. In 1992, she received the Founders Prize from the Canadian History of Education Association for her book titled Gender and Education in Ontario: An Historical Reader edited with Alison Prentice.

With colleagues Monique Frize and Claire Deschênes, Heap documented the history of the International Conferences of Women Engineers and Scientists (ICWES) and related international movements, which examine Canadian experiences within a global context. Their latest book Women’s Contribution to Science and Technology through ICWES Conferences discusses the legacy of the conference series, which was started by volunteers in 1964 and is an enduring global event.

In 2008, she received a Fulbright Scholarship, enabling her to serve as a visiting professor at Kennesaw State University and Georgia Tech in Atlanta, Georgia. In 2010, Heap received the Professional Engineers Ontario (PEO) President’s Award for her work in encouraging women to consider engineering as a career.

In 2017, the French government appointed her Chevalier de l’Ordre des Palmes académiques (Knight of the Order of Academic Palms) for her work on the history of women’s contributions in science and engineering.

In 2018, Heap was awarded the Ursula Franklin Award by the Royal Society of Canada for her contributions in furthering our understanding of issues concerning gender.

== Awards and honours ==
- 1992 Founder’s Prize, Canadian History of Education Association
- 2008 Fulbright Scholarship
- 2010 Professional Engineers Ontario President’s Award
- 2017 Ordre des Palmes académiques
- 2018 Ursula Franklin Award, Royal Society of Canada

== Selected publications ==
- Heap, R., Millar, W. and Smyth, E. (2005). Learning to Practise: Professional Education in Historical and Contemporary Perspective. Ottawa, University of Ottawa Press, 311 p.
- Heap, R. (2006). “The only girl in such a big class”: Women Students at the University of Toronto’s Faculty of Applied Science and Engineering during the 1920s and the 1930s. Scientia Canadensis, 29(2), 45–73.
- Frize, M., Deschênes, C. and Heap, R. (2024). Women’s Contribution to Science and Technology through ICWES Conferences. Women in Engineering and Science Series. Springer.
- Heap, R. and Prentice, A. (1991). Gender and Education in Ontario: An Historical Reader. Canadian Scholar’s Press.
