= Emily Elliott (scientist) =

American geoscientist

- Education: Johns Hopkins University
- Scientific career
- Thesis: Organic nitrogen isotope stratigraphy, palynology, and sediment history of freshwater wetlands in the Chesapeake Bay basin : comparison with land use history (2003)

Emily Maureen Elliot is a professor at the University of Pittsburgh who is known for her work linking nitrogen cycling and human activities. She was elected a fellow of the Ecological Society of America in 2024.

== Education and career ==
Elliott received a B.A. from the University of Virginia and an M.S. from Johns Hopkins University. She earned her Ph.D. from Johns Hopkins University in 2003. As a postdoctoral fellow, she worked with Carol Kendall at the United States Geological Survey. She then moved to the University of Pittsburgh, and as of 2026 she is a professor and director of the Pittsburgh Collaboratory for Water Research, Education, and Outreach.

== Research ==
Elliott is known for her research on nitrogen cycling, with a particular focus on how people impact the nitrogen cycle. Her early research investigated how isotopes of nitrogran can be used to track atmospheric deposition of nitrogen. She used nitrogen isotopes to track emissions from coal plants and precipitation from hurricanes. Her research has also investigated how chemicals used during the treatment of drinking water end up in urban streams.

== Awards and honors ==
In 2018 Elliot received the Sulzman Award for excellence in education and mentoring from the American Geophysical Union. In 2024 the Ecological Society of America elected Elliot as a fellow.

== Selected publications ==
- Elliott, E. M.; Kendall, C.; Wankel, S. D.; Burns, D. A.; Boyer, E. W.; Harlin, K.; Bain, D. J.; Butler, T. J. (2007-11-01). "Nitrogen Isotopes as Indicators of NO x Source Contributions to Atmospheric Nitrate Deposition Across the Midwestern and Northeastern United States". Environmental Science & Technology. 41 (22): 7661–7667. doi:10.1021/es070898t. ISSN 0013-936X.
- Kendall, Carol; Elliott, Emily M.; Wankel, Scott D. (2007-07-14). "Tracing Anthropogenic Inputs of Nitrogen to Ecosystems". Stable Isotopes in Ecology and Environmental Science. Wiley. doi:10.1002/9780470691854.ch12. ISBN 978-1-4051-2680-9.
- Elliott, E. M.; Kendall, C.; Boyer, E. W.; Burns, D. A.; Lear, G. G.; Golden, H. E.; Harlin, K.; Bytnerowicz, A.; Butler, T. J.; Glatz, R. (2009). "Dual nitrate isotopes in dry deposition: Utility for partitioning NO x source contributions to landscape nitrogen deposition". Journal of Geophysical Research: Biogeosciences. 114 (G4). doi:10.1029/2008JG000889. ISSN 0148-0227.
- Felix, J. David; Elliott, Emily M. (2014). "Isotopic composition of passively collected nitrogen dioxide emissions: Vehicle, soil and livestock source signatures". Atmospheric Environment. 92: 359–366. doi:10.1016/j.atmosenv.2014.04.005.
