= International Journal of Law and Psychiatry =

- Discipline: Forensic psychiatry
- Language: English
- Edited by: David Weisstub

Publication details
- History: 1978-present
- Publisher: Elsevier
- Frequency: Bimonthly
- Impact factor: 1.203 (2016)

Standard abbreviations
- Bluebook: Int'l J.L. & Psychiatry
- ISO 4: Int. J. Law Psychiatry

Indexing
- ISSN: 0160-2527 (print); 1873-6386 (web)
- LCCN: 78643650
- OCLC no.: 863227445

Links
- Journal homepage; Online access

The International Journal of Law and Psychiatry is a bimonthly peer-reviewed medical journal covering forensic psychiatry. It was established in 1978 by Pergamon Press and is currently published by Elsevier on behalf of the International Academy of Law and Mental Health, of which it is the official journal. The editor-in-chief is David Weisstub (Université de Montréal). According to the Journal Citation Reports, the journal has a 2016 impact factor of 1.203.
