= Lionel Boulet =

Canadian engineer (1919–1996)

- Born: July 29, 1919; Quebec City, Quebec
- Died: January 1, 1996 (aged 76)
- Awards: Order of Canada; National Order of Quebec

Lionel Boulet, OC OQ (July 29, 1919 – January 1, 1996) was a Canadian engineer, academic, and utilities executive.

Born in Quebec City, Boulet received a Bachelor of Arts degree in 1938 and a Bachelor of Science degree in electrical engineering in 1942 from Université Laval. He received a Master of Science degree in 1947 from the University of Illinois. Later he received a Doctor of Science degree in 1968 from Sir George Williams University and a D.Gén. from the University of Ottawa. He was made a Fellow of the Engineering Institute of Canada in 1973 for leadership in the establishment and management of the Research Institute of Hydro-Quebec.

From 1950 to 1964, he taught at Université Laval and was chairman of the electrical engineering department. In 1964, he joined Hydro-Québec as a consultant and was appointed the first Director of the Institut de recherche d'Hydro-Québec (IREQ) in 1967, a position he occupied until 1982.

== Honours ==
In 1975, he was made an Officer of the Order of Canada "in recognition of his contribution to the development of applied research in the field of electrical engineering and energy resources". He was posthumously made an Officer of the National Order of Quebec in June 1996. In 1993, he was the first recipient of the Prix Armand-Frappier. The Prix Lionel-Boulet is named in his honour. In 1968, he received an honorary doctorate from Sir George Williams University, which later became Concordia University. He was also awarded honorary degrees from Université Laval and McGill University.
