= Tokamak de Varennes =

Tokamak fusion reactor in Montreal, Canada

- Device type: Tokamak
- Location: Varennes, Quebec, Canada
- Affiliation: National Research Council, Hydro-Québec

Technical specifications
- Major radius: 85 cm (33 in)
- Minor radius: 27 cm (11 in)
- Magnetic field: 1.5 T (15,000 G) (toroidal)
- Discharge duration: 30 s
- Plasma current: 200 kA (later 300)

History
- Date(s) of construction: 1983
- Year(s) of operation: 1986–1997

The Tokamak de Varennes, or TdeV for short, was a tokamak fusion reactor built in Varennes, Quebec, a suburb of Montreal, Canada. A distinguishing feature of the system was a power supply able to keep the system running for up to 30 seconds, over ten times that of most devices of the era. It studied issues related to the interactions of the plasma and the inner wall of the reactor, as well as the "scrape off layer" of low-energy ions near the outside of the plasma volume.

The TdeV plans developed during the late 1970s. At the time, a number of very large tokamaks were under construction with the goal of reaching breakeven, which was expected around 1982 to 1983. A smaller device could not match these conditions, but could still be useful for exploring the many unresolved practical issues of a commercial system. A formal plan was presented in late 1980, and in January 1981 the Canadian government announced they would provide funding for the project via the National Research Council Canada in partnership with Hydro-Québec. It was the largest scientific project in Canadian history.

TdeV was built at the Institut de recherche d'Hydro-Québec (IREQ) laboratories in Varennes starting in 1983. It began operations in 1986 and operated continually until 1997, generating a large number of scientific reports. Experience on this system, along with the ready presence of tritium from the CANDU reactors, was the basis for a failed pitch to locate ITER in Canada at the Darlington Nuclear Generating Station. Federal funding ended in 1997; Hydro-Quebec could not afford the $20 million yearly operational budget, and operations ended.

TdeV was still fully operational when it was shut down, and an effort began to sell it whole. Iran offered the only serious bid, but political pressure made this impossible. Ultimately, the only sale was one of its plasma heating systems to General Atomics as part of upgrades to their DIII-D tokamak. The rest of the machine eventually ended up as a major display in the Canada Science and Technology Museum in Ottawa.

== History ==
=== Tokamak rush ===
When the tokamak concept was first revealed by Soviet researchers in 1965, the results were so good that international observers dismissed them as measurement errors. A follow-up in 1968 showed even better results, 10 to 100 times the best seen in other labs. Once again the other labs dismissed the Soviet results. This time, however, Lev Artsimovich was prepared. He invited a team of UK researchers to use their newly developed laser-based thermometer on their T-3 device to see if the temperatures they were measuring were accurate. After significant setup and calibration, by the summer of 1969 the UK team, nicknamed "the Culham Five", found that the results were even better than the Soviets had reported the previous year.

The result is what is today known as the "tokamak rush". The Soviet results suggested that the tokamak was the first large-scale device that clearly beat a significant barrier to progress up to that date, Bohm diffusion. While some experiments in the UK and US also showed signs of beating this limit, they did so at lower temperatures that were not useful for a power producing device. The tokamak's plasma was remaining stable even at the very highest temperatures the device was capable of. Interest in other approaches waned, and by 1970 there were dozens of efforts around the world to beat the Soviet results.

By the mid-1970s, a number of lingering questions about the tokamak concept had been answered. For one, larger machines around the world had demonstrated that the system "scaled", that is, as they grew larger they held their plasma for a longer time. Another issue was that the tokamak, unlike other designs, did not directly heat its plasma to the temperatures needed for practical devices. Solutions to this issue were proven in the Princeton Large Torus, which by 1977 had reached ion temperatures of 60 million Kelvin, right in the sweet spot for a commercial system.

With a decade of successful advances, what remained was to put all of these concepts and systems together in a single machine and operate it on a real fuel of deuterium-tritium (D-T). It was widely expected that such designs would hit the goal of breakeven, producing more energy than was needed to run the system. Four such designs were proposed, the US's TFTR, Japan's JT-60 (originally known as the Breakeven Test Facility), the Soviet T-15, and the pan-European JET. There was widespread expectation that breakeven would be announced by one of these machines by 1983 at the latest.

=== Project Fusion Canada ===
In 1968, Hydro-Québec opened its Varennes research center, the Institut de recherche d'Hydro-Québec (IREQ). Two years later, Institut National de la Recherche Scientifique (INRS), a technical university, opened the Energy Research Centre, ERC, next to the IREQ site. Now known as INRS-Eergie, the ERC quickly became a center of excellence in plasma physics. Along with like-minded researchers at RCA Victor in Montreal, the University of Montreal and the DND Valcartier, interest in examining fusion technology was growing.

As the tokamak was first emerging in the early 1970s, a multi-party group formed as Project Fusion Canada to explore the concept. They produced a report in November 1974 that suggested the country could contribute to the fusion effort by working on "scientific know-how, engineering and technological awareness capability". The government largely ignored the report, only acknowledging it to the point of stating that the National Research Council (NRC) would be responsible in the case that such a project was pursued.

In mid-1977, the NRC formed the Advisory Committee on Fusion Related Research, and in July 1978 announced the National Fusion Program with a small budget of CAD$260,000. Due to inaction at the federal level, the budget remained at this level for the next three years. This was enough only for very small-scale work and far too low to build devices, which led to a brain drain to the United States labs. To help make up for the lack of funding, the Natural Sciences and Engineering Research Council arranged for another CAD$750,000 a year in direct grants to universities.

In March 1980, a group led by physicist Morrel Bachynski including the Advisory Committee and a large number of interested parties in universities and industry presented a report to the federal government's Minister of State for Science and Technology pointing out that Canada was the only industrialized nation without a fusion program. They suggested that if fusion was successful there would be no experience in the country or supply chains set up that could sell the "specialized sub-systems and auxiliary equipment on a world wide basis." Noting that global funding was reaching USD$2 billion a year, if Canada wanted to have any say in a fusion future, they would need to be highly focussed on solving particular problems that were not being explored elsewhere.

They proposed a three-prong research program. Given Canada's extensive experience in tritium handling through their CANDU reactors, a program studying fuel cycles and related engineering issues was a natural fit, and this emerged as the Fusion Fuels Technology Program run by the NRC and Ontario Hydro. They also suggested that the NRC's existing laser research group that had world-leading CO2 lasers should form an inertial confinement fusion (ICF) study group. They also suggested funding be provided to place Canadian scientists and engineers at various international fusion experiments. But the major effort, accounting for over 90% of their proposed budget, would be for the construction of a tokamak at the IREQ facility.

=== Construction and operations ===
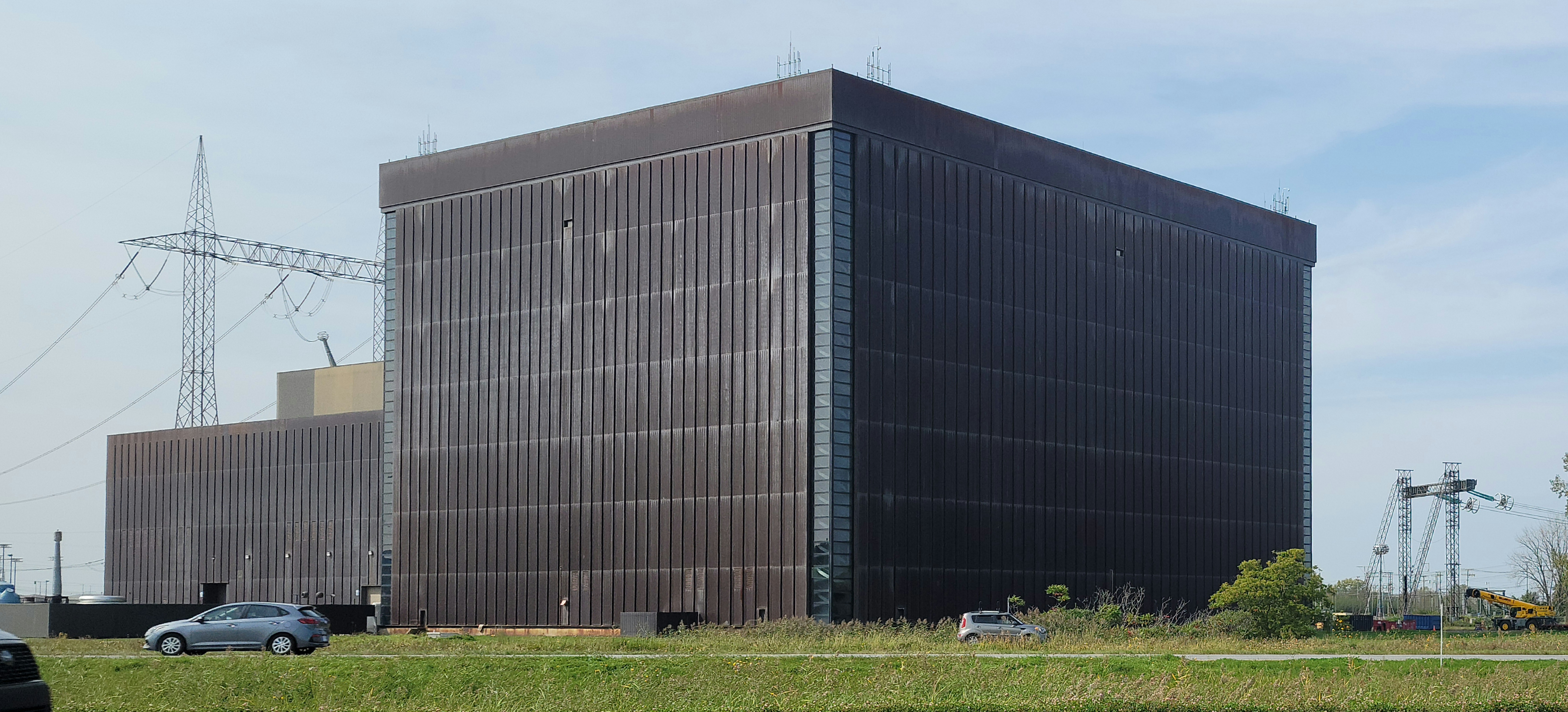
The TdeV was built in the Electricity Research Center (IREQ).

On 16 January 1981, John Roberts announced that the Ministry would be providing CAD$18.7 million (equivalent to $62,030,000 in 2025) over five years to fund the building and operation of a tokamak, with Hydro-Québec providing matching funding. The actual construction and staffing would mostly be provided by the University of Montreal and INRS along with the private firms CANATOM and MPB Technologies, Bachynski's own company. The formal agreement between the NRC and Hydro was signed on 14 September 1982. A Management Coordination Committee was formed that November with Bachynski as the chair, and Richard Bolton was selected as the project director.

The goal of the design was to produce a system that could operate for much longer times than any proposed reactor of the era. It was assumed that commercial systems would operate continually for periods on the order of minutes, giving the system time to burn an appreciable amount of its fuel. Other designs were generally intended to operate in short bursts, on the order of a second or less, and the peak operational conditions were only maintained for milliseconds. TdeV was designed to reach pulse lengths of 30 seconds, which would allow it to gather much more experimental data on the non-fusion operations of a reactor, like interactions between the plasma and the vacuum container (the "first wall") and the operation of a diverter, a key part of future designs that had not been well explored.

Construction began in building 9 of the IREQ facility in 1983 with an initial first-plasma date in late 1984. First plasma was achieved in 1986.

=== Closure and sale ===
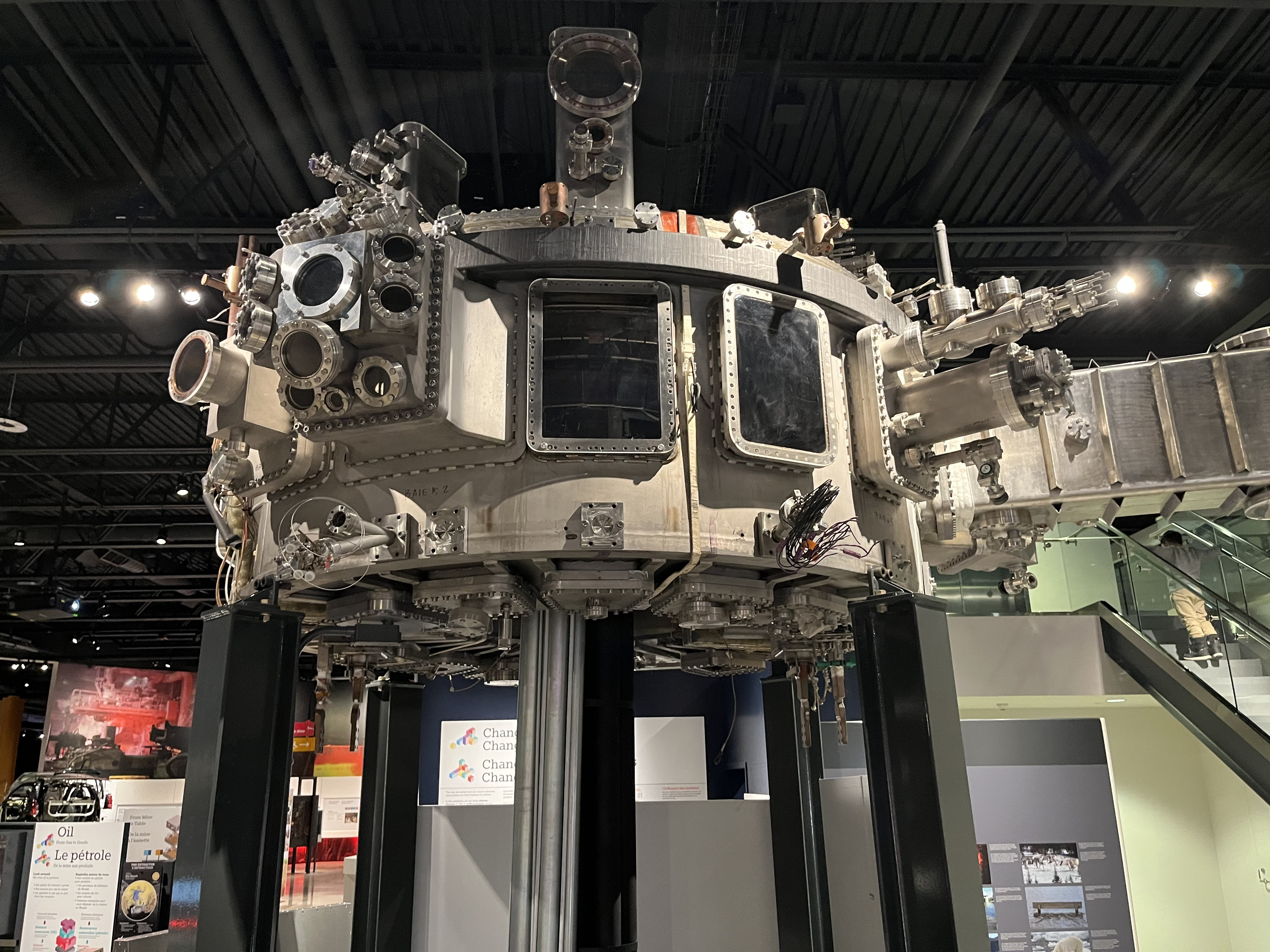
Tokamak de Varennes as it is seen today at the Canada Science and Technology Museum in Ottawa

After ten years of successful operations, NRC decided to end funding for TdeV in 1997. The system cost roughly CAD$20 million a year to operate at that time, a cost that Hydro-Québec was unwilling to take on its own. Since the system was fully operational, it was put on the market for sale to any reasonable party, first to other labs in Canada, and when that turned up nothing, on the international market.

After being on the market for some time, in 1999 it was announced a deal had been arranged to sell it to the government of Iran, for somewhere between $50 and $90 million. This led to protests from the United States, who claimed it could be used for weapons research. The potential sale was also a subject of scorn among the federal opposition parties.

Eventually, one of the gyrotron heating systems was sold to General Atomics for use with their DIII-D, which led to the offer from Iran being dropped. In 2001, with no other bids forthcoming, the system was transferred to the Canada Science and Technology Museum in Ottawa.

== Design ==
One key aspect of the tokamak concept is the induction of an electrical current through the plasma once it is formed. This current creates a magnetic field that combines with the field provided by external magnets to produce a complex overall field that confines the fuel. Magnetic fields can only be induced by changing electrical fields, which was a significant problem in existing machines because it requires the current fed into the plasma to continually increase. As there is a minimum amount of current that will be needed for confinement, the result is that the current in the magnet starts large and gets larger. For long discharges this was simply not practical, and most designs assumed there would be an alternate solution available by the systems were reaching commercial energy levels.

For TdeV, the goal was long confinement, not high fusion performance. For this reason the system was designed to operate with the induced current alternating in direction over a period of 100 milliseconds while the system as a whole operated for as long as 30 seconds. The current reversal was considered an important area of study by itself. Diagnostics of the interaction of the plasma and the first wall were also an area of new development, using a laser to induce fluorescence to measure atomic hydrogen densities.

The vacuum tube is roughly square in cross section, made of Inconel. The top section is removable, consisting of two C-shaped pieces that are soldered onto the rest of the toroid. Inside is a replaceable liner which is in turn lined with six refractory metal plates that are designed to absorb the plasma that escapes from the interior reaction area. The entire torus is surrounded by sixteen toroidal field coils, with separate poloidal coils above and below the torus inside the rectangular toroidal coils.
