= Holly Barnard =

American geographer

Holly René Barnard
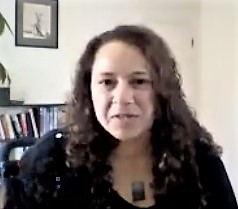
- Barnard in 2020
- Education: Oregon State University; Colorado State University; University of Washington
- Scientific career
- Workplaces: University of Colorado Boulder; University of Wyoming
- Thesis: Inter-relationships of vegetation, hydrology and micro-climate in a young, Douglas-fir forest (2009)
- Doctoral advisor: Jeffrey J. McDonnell and Barbara J. Bond

Holly René Barnard is an American geographer and associate professor of geography at the University of Colorado Boulder. She studies how vegetation impacts the dynamics and pathways of streams. In 2020 Barnard was awarded a $7 million National Science Foundation grant to set up a Critical Zone Observatory at the University of Colorado Boulder.

== Early life and education ==
Barnard earned her bachelor's degree in forestry and ecosystems at the University of Washington, where she worked with Tom Hinckley and Linda Brubaker. After being inspired to work in environmental science, Barnard moved to Colorado State University to work toward a master's degree in forest engineering, where she worked on tree physiology with Michael Ryan and Dan Binckley, her advisors. Barnard was first introduced to ecological methods whilst working in their research labs. After graduating, Barnard worked in environmental consulting, completing ground- and surface water sampling. She was certified as an ecologist by the Ecological Society of America in 2004. Barnard eventually joined Oregon State University as a doctoral student, where she worked under the supervision of Jeffrey J. McDonnell and Barbara J. Bond on a Ford Foundation fellowship. She studied the relationships between vegetation water use, hydrology and the climate. As a graduate student, Barnard was selected to take part in the national Minorities Striving and Pursuing Higher Degrees of Success in Earth System Science (MS PHDs) programme, which supported her to attend the American Geophysical Union annual conference. In 2009 Barnard was made an National Science Foundation Minority Postdoctoral Fellow, allowing her to join the University of Wyoming to study water loss from forest vegetation.

== Research and career ==
Barnard looks to understand how vegetation impacts water flow and how water flow influences vegetation function in mountainous terrain. She has studied the fairy circles of Namibia using a combination of experimental investigations and computational modelling. In 2017 she visited Namibia with an all-women research team, conducting a series of experiments in the Namib desert to better understand their origin. As part of this work, Barnard and co-workers showed that grazing animals play an important role in maintaining the circles. She has investigated the impact of climate change on coniferous forests by studying the exchange of carbon dioxide between forests and the atmosphere.

At Colorado, Barnard is involved with the Cooperative Institute for Research in Environmental Sciences (CIRES) education and outreach program, which looks to strengthen environmental literacy and support the next generation of scientific researchers in training for careers in sustainability. In 2020 Barnard was awarded a $7 million National Science Foundation grant to establish the University of Colorado Boulder Critical Zone Observatory. The observatory looks to understand how vegetation, water and rocks change in the fire- and drought-prone ecosystems of the West Coast of the United States. As part of this effort, Barnard developed low cost, low power, easy-to-assemble devices capable of measuring photosynthetically active radiation (PAR). A network of so-called PARduinos can be assembled across ground, providing constant measurements of PAR and allowing for Barnard and co-workers to model tree growth.

== Personal ==
Barnard uses "she/they" pronouns. Barnard enjoys the outdoors, including activities like "climbing, road biking, skiing and deadlifting." She also enjoys spending quality time with her pets and her partner.

== Selected publications ==
- Renée Brooks, J.; Barnard, Holly R.; Coulombe, Rob; McDonnell, Jeffrey J. (December 20, 2009). "Ecohydrologic separation of water between trees and streams in a Mediterranean climate". Nature Geoscience. 3 (2): 100–104. doi:10.1038/ngeo722. ISSN 1752-0894. S2CID 13069081.
- McDowell, N.; Barnard, H.; Bond, B.; Hinckley, T.; Hubbard, R.; Ishii, H.; Köstner, B.; Magnani, F.; Marshall, J.; Meinzer, F.; Phillips, N. (June 1, 2002). "The relationship between tree height and leaf area: sapwood area ratio". Oecologia. 132 (1): 12–20. Bibcode:2002Oecol.132...12M. doi:10.1007/s00442-002-0904-x. ISSN 1432-1939. PMID 28547290. S2CID 18777347.
- Barnard, H. R.; Ryan, M. G. (2003). "A test of the hydraulic limitation hypothesis in fast-growing Eucalyptus saligna". Plant, Cell & Environment. 26 (8): 1235–1245. Bibcode:2003PCEnv..26.1235B. doi:10.1046/j.1365-3040.2003.01046.x. ISSN 1365-3040.
