= Charonne station =

Metro station in Paris, France

Charonne
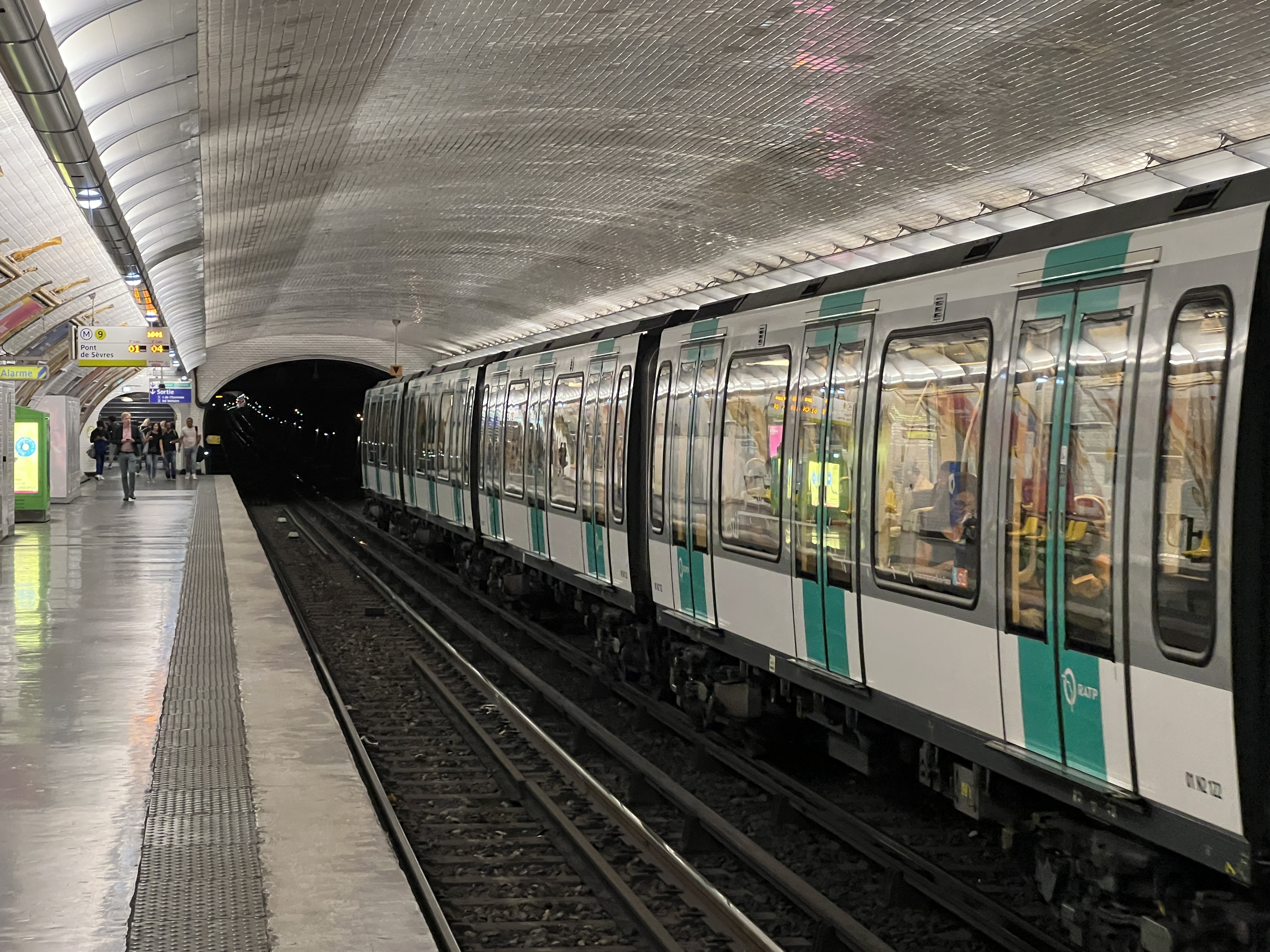

General information
- Location: 11th arrondissement of Paris; Île-de-France; France
- Coordinates: 48°51′18″N 2°23′05″E
- System: Paris Métro station
- Owner: RATP
- Operator: RATP

Other information
- Fare zone: 1

History
- Opened: 10 December 1933

Services
Preceding station	Paris Metro	Following station
Voltaire towards Pont de Sèvres	Line 9	Rue des Boulets towards Mairie de Montreuil
Location
- Location within Paris

Charonne (French pronunciation: [ʃaʁɔn]) is a station on Line 9 of the Paris Métro. It was opened on 10 December 1933 with the extension of the line from Richelieu–Drouot to Porte de Montreuil.

The station is named after the Rue de Charonne and the district of Charonne. In 1008, Robert II of France the Pious gave Charonne to the Abbey of Saint-Magloire, but it changed hands over the centuries. A small locality developed around the castle of Charonne, which was largely annexed by Paris in 1860.

== The Charonne Métro station massacre ==
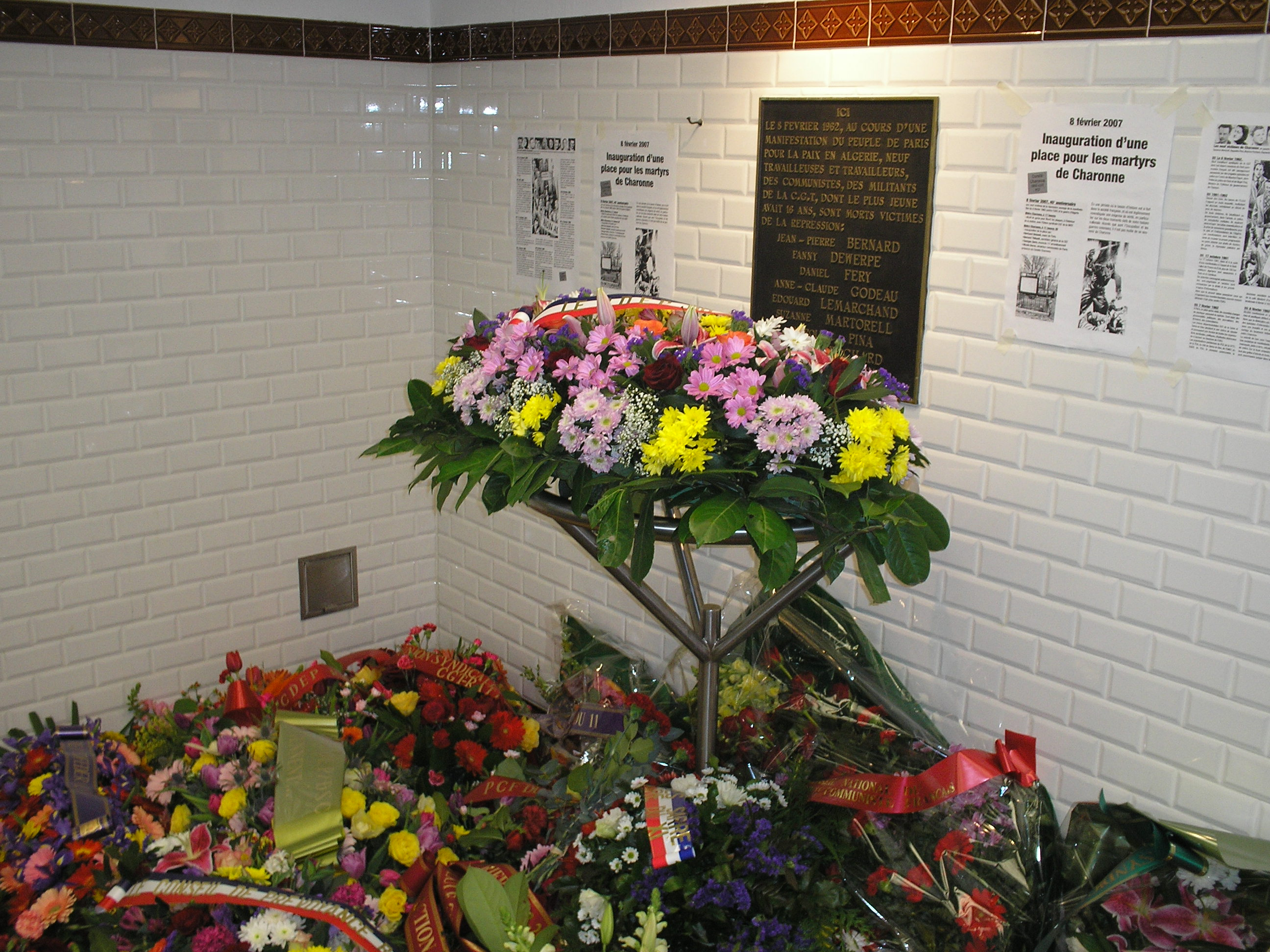
Commemorative floral tributes by the memorial plaque at the station, 2007

During the Algerian War of Independence (1954–1962) most French politicians came to accept the need to grant Algeria its independence. Only the Organisation armée secrète (OAS; Secret Armed Organization) continued to resist independence. The Left called for a demonstration on 8 February 1962 to denounce the OAS and the Algerian war. The Paris Police, led by Maurice Papon, repressed this demonstration, as it had done on 17 October 1961 (when between 32 and 200, mainly Algerian people, are estimated to have been killed). Police blocked nearby streets at both ends before charging the crowd. Demonstrators tried to take refuge in the entry of the Charonne metro station, but police pursued the crowd into the station and hurled heavy iron plates (used around the bases of trees and on metro vents) down onto demonstrators in the stairwells. Eight people were crushed to death or died from skull fractures and a ninth died from wounds in hospital. All of the dead, except a sixteen-year-old boy, were Communist Party or union members. Police blamed the violence on the demonstrators. A massive funeral demonstration drew between a quarter and a half million participants. The dead are buried in the Père Lachaise Cemetery near the Mur des Fédérés. A ceremony at a memorial plaque in the station is held each February 8.

== Station layout ==
Street Level

B1	Mezzanine

Line 9 platforms	Side platform, doors will open on the right
Line 9 platforms	Westbound	← toward Pont de Sèvres (Voltaire)
Line 9 platforms	Eastbound	toward Mairie de Montreuil (Rue des Boulets) →
Line 9 platforms	Side platform, doors will open on the right
