= Sylvain Martel =

- Born: Canada
- Education: Massachusetts Institute of Technology; McGill University; Universite du Quebec
- Scientific career
- Workplaces: Ecole Polytechnique de Montreal; McGill University; Massachusetts Institute of Technology
- Website: Ecole Polytechnique Profile

Sylvain Martel CM CD is a Canadian researcher noted for his work on the development of innovative cancer treatments. Martel is a professor at the Ecole Polytechnique de Montreal, Canada and the Director of the NanoRobotics Laboratory. He was named Fellow of the Institute of Electrical and Electronics Engineers (IEEE) in 2015 for contributions to medical micro- and nano-robotics and holds a Tier 1 Canada Research Chair.
