= Boulet (surname) =

Boulet is a French surname. Notable people with the surname include:

- Edgar Boulet (born 1995), French artistic gymnast
- Gerry Boulet (1946–1990), Canadian rock singer and lead vocal of Offenbach
- Jean Boulet (aviator) (1920–2011), French aviator
- Jean Boulet (politician), Canadian politician and Minister of Labour
- Jonathan Boulet, Australian born musician, self-titled and drummer for 'Parades'
- Julie Boulet (born 1959), Canadian politician and Quebec provincial Cabinet minister
- Juliette Boulet (born 1981), Belgian politician
- Lionel Boulet (1919–1996), Canadian engineer
- Magdalena Lewy-Boulet (born 1973), American runner
- Margot Boulet (born 1990), French adaptive rower
- Paul Boulet (1894–1982), French Christian democrat politician
- Sergio Alvarez Boulet (born 1979), Cuban weightlifter
- Yayma Boulet (born 1983), Cuban women's basketball player

Fictional characters:

- Jeanie Boulet, a character from the television series ER
