= Rue des Boulets station =

Paris Métro station

Rue des Boulets
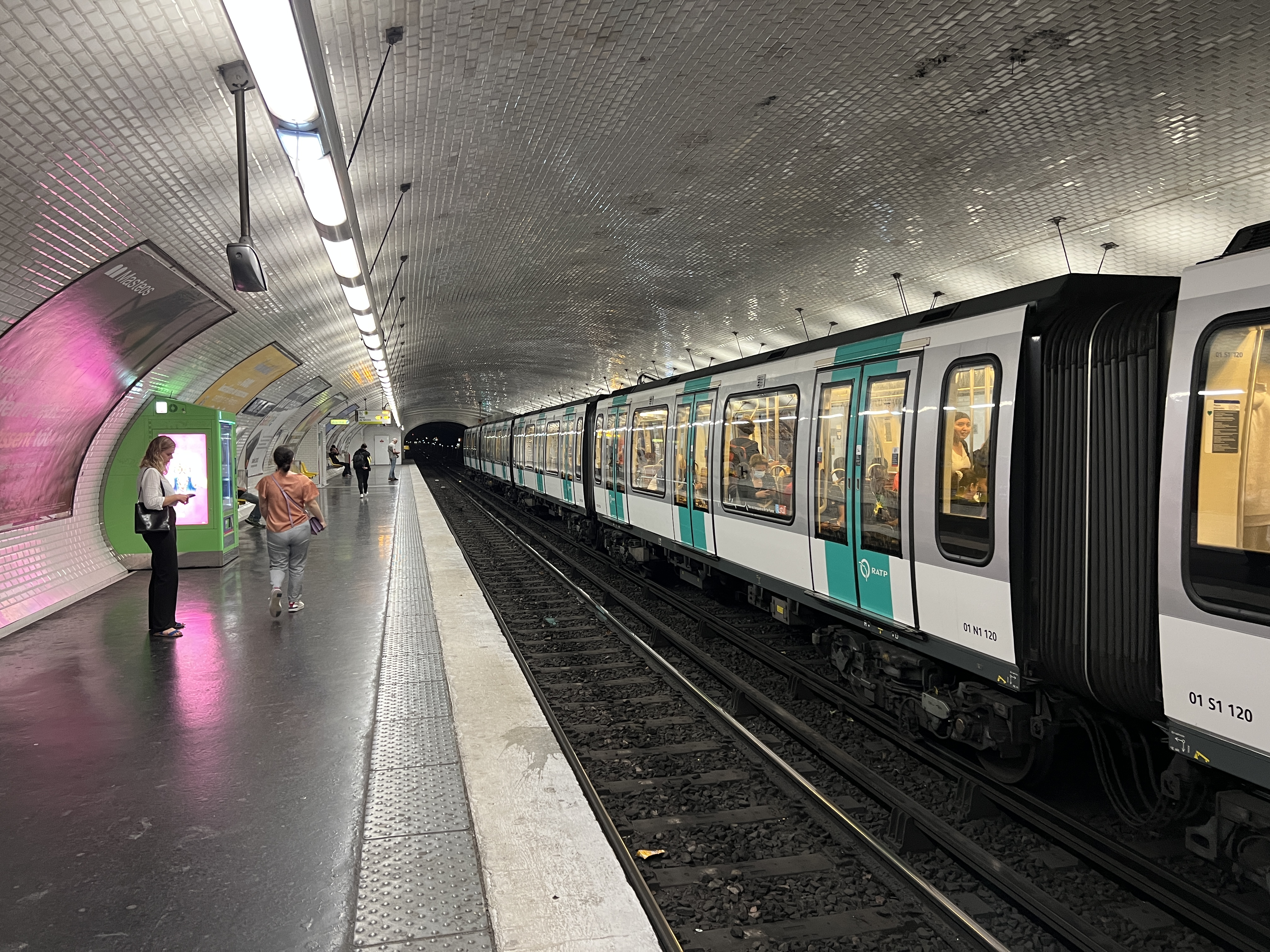

General information
- Location: 11th arrondissement of Paris; Île-de-France; France
- Coordinates: 48°51′07″N 2°23′25″E
- System: Paris Métro station
- Owner: RATP
- Operator: RATP

Other information
- Fare zone: 1

History
- Opened: 10 December 1933

Services
Preceding station	Paris Metro	Following station
Charonne towards Pont de Sèvres	Line 9	Nation towards Mairie de Montreuil
Location
- Location within Paris

Rue des Boulets (French pronunciation: [ʁy de bulɛ]) is a station on Line 9 of the Paris Métro in the 11th arrondissement of Paris.

The station was opened on 10 December 1933 with the extension of the line from Richelieu–Drouot to Porte de Montreuil. It was originally called Rue des Boulets – Rue de Montreuil, before it was simply renamed Boulets – Montreuil. In 1998 it was renamed after the neighbouring Rue des Boulets. The street (which has had its current name since 1672) is part of the old road between Saint-Denis and Saint-Maur.

== Station layout ==
Street Level

B1	Mezzanine

Line 9 platforms	Side platform, doors will open on the right
Line 9 platforms	Westbound	← toward Pont de Sèvres (Charonne)
Line 9 platforms	Eastbound	toward Mairie de Montreuil (Nation) →
Line 9 platforms	Side platform, doors will open on the right

== Gallery ==
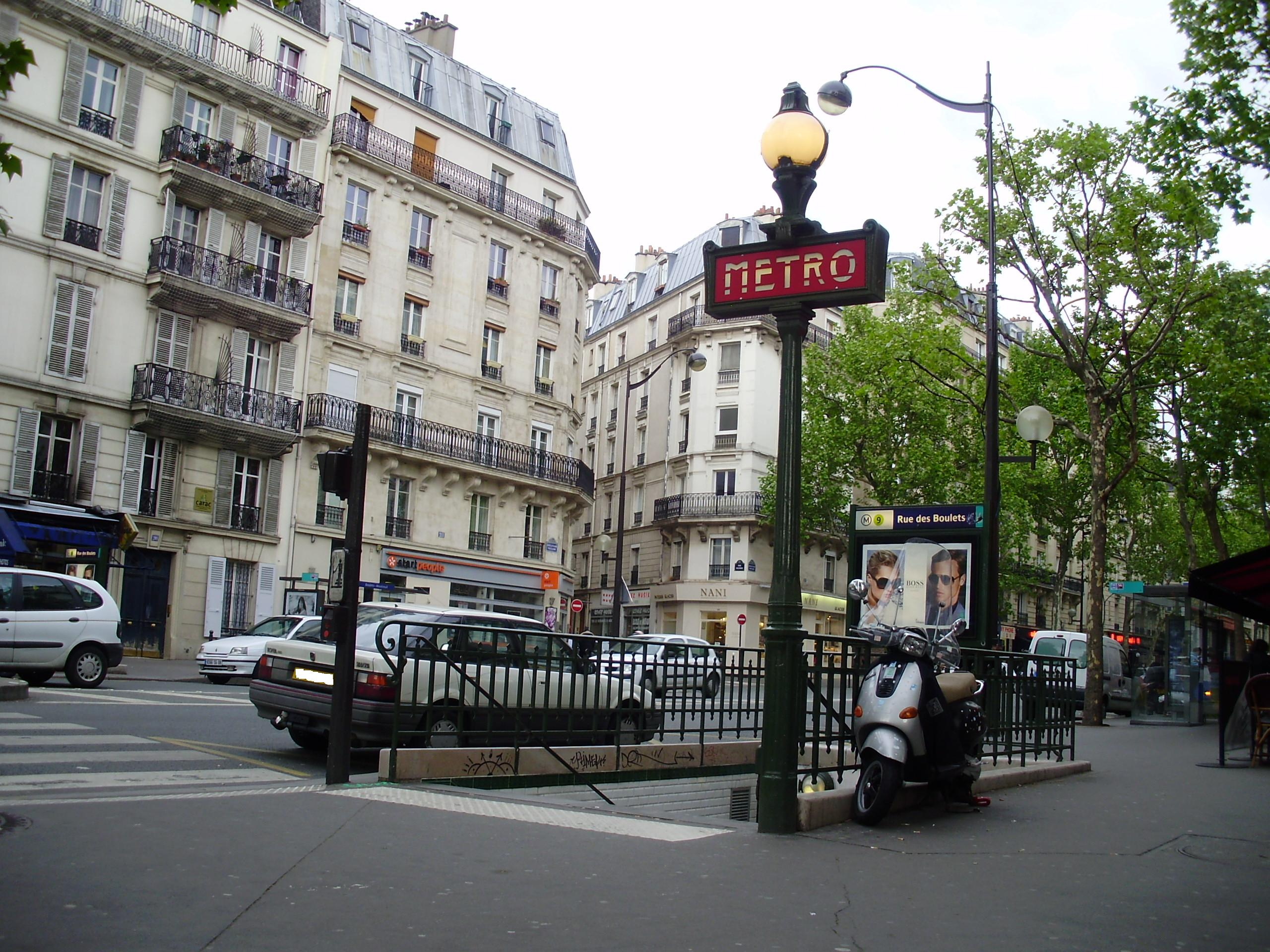
Street-level entrance at Rue des Boulets

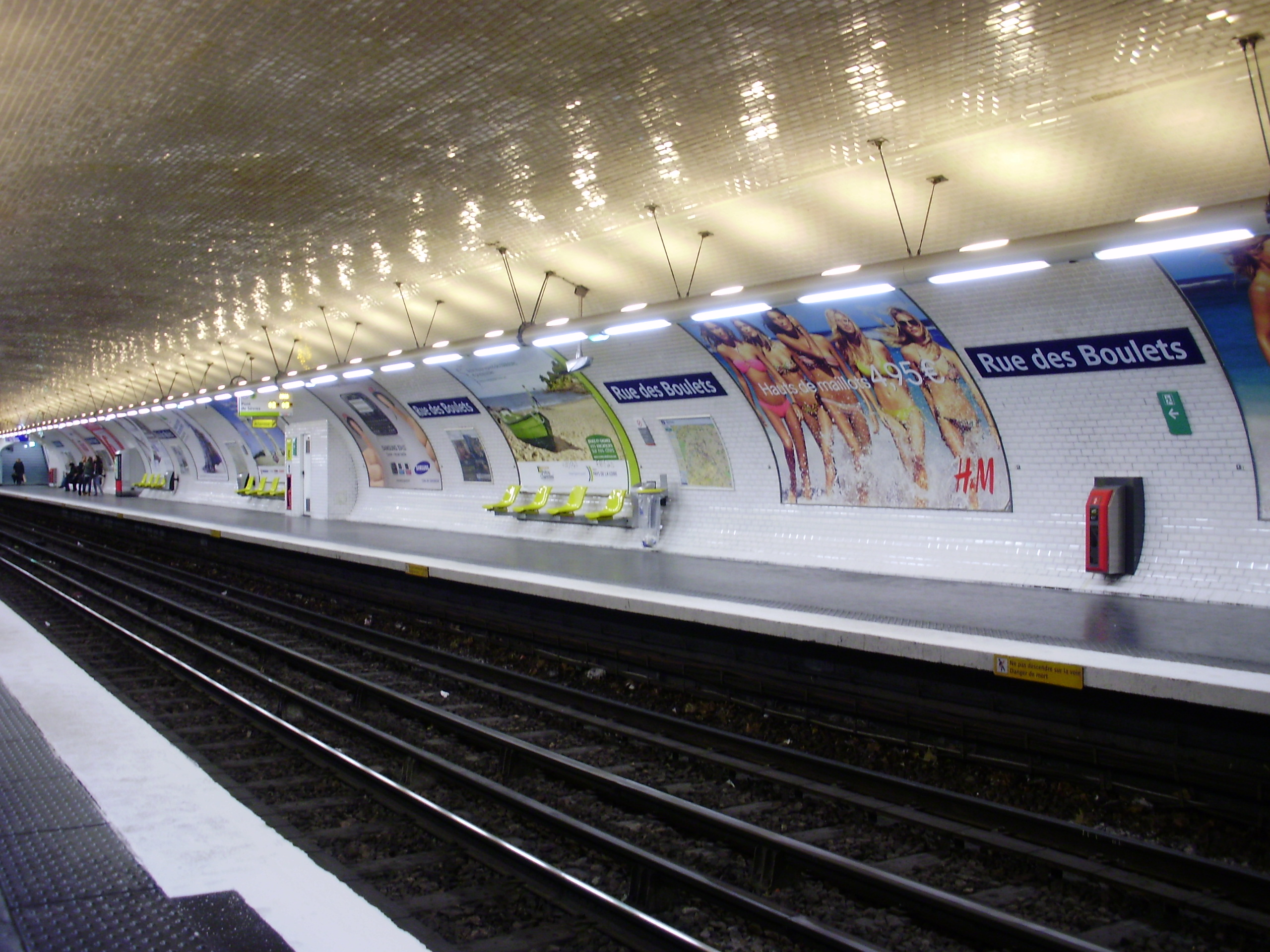
Line 9 platforms at Rue des Boulets
