= Claire Deschênes =

Canadian engineer

- Born: Shawinigan
- Other name: Dame Turbine
- Education: Grenoble Institute of Technology, Université Laval
- Employer: Hydro-Québec (1977–1979)
- Awards: Prix Lionel-Boulet (2020); honorary doctor of the University of Sherbrooke (2019); Honorary doctor of the University of Ottawa (2016); Synergy Awards for Innovation (2014); Member of the Order of Canada (2019); Knight of the National Order of Quebec (2020)

Claire Deschênes CM CQ (born 1954) is a Canadian mechanical engineer, an engineering professor at the Department of Mechanical Engineering Université Laval, and a member of the Order of Canada. She is the first female professor of engineering at the Faculty of Science and Engineering at Laval University, and is an expert in hydraulic turbine technology, hydrodynamics, and fluid mechanics.

== Early life and education ==
While she was in a CEGEP program, Deschênes' father died and her mother was diagnosed with multiple sclerosis. Deschênes completed two years of CEGEP in psychology, before taking a year off to take care of her mother, and then completed a CEGEP year in the mathematics, physics, and biology stream. Later on, she pursued mechanical engineering during her undergraduate degree, and cites her reasons for going into science to include the desire to have a stable career as she may have to help her siblings one day.

Deschênes was the only woman in her undergraduate program, and went on to do a master's degree in mechanical engineering at Université Laval. Upon receiving a scholarship to study abroad, Deschênes pursued a PhD at the Institut National Politechnique de Grenoble in France, where she studied computational fluid dynamics in hydraulic turbines, and completed her degree in January 1990 before returning to her Université Laval to become the first female professor of engineering at the Faculty of Science and Engineering.

== Career ==
Deschênes founded the Laboratoire de Machines Hydrauliques (LAMH) in 1989, which is a centre for hydraulic turbines research. In 2007, Deschênes created the Consortium en machines hydrauliques, which is an academic-industry collaboration, including Hydro Québec and Natural Resources Canada, to carry out research on high-power hydraulic turbines. Deschênes and the Consortium have received support from industry and federal grants (including those from the Canada Foundation for Innovation (CFI) and NSERC Collaborative Research and Development grants) to purchase equipment and carry out collaborative research, such as analysing 3D turbine flow patterns with computer simulations, and investigating factors which influence durability of low-head turbines. Deschênes' findings have led to a better understanding of turbines and hydro-electric technology.

Between 1997 and 2006, Deschênes served as the Natural Sciences and Engineering Research Council and NSERC-Alcan International Limited Chair for Women in Science and Engineering (CWSE) at Université Laval. She has co-founded three non-profit organizations to support and promote women in science and engineering: the International Network for Women Engineers and Scientists (INWES), the Association de la francophonie à propos des femmes en sciences, technologies, ingénierie et mathématiques (AFFESTIM), and the INWES Educational and Research Institute (ERI).

Deschênes has received multiple honours and awards. Of note, in 2015, Deschênes received the Natural Sciences and Engineering Research Council's Synergy Award for Innovation, in the partnership category, in recognition of her effective collaborations between industry and academia. She is a fellow of Engineers Canada (2015), and been named a Le Soleil and Radio-Canada laureate twice (in the science and research category). She was awarded an honorary doctorate from the University of Ottawa in 2016.

On 27 June 2019, Deschênes was appointed a member of the Order of Canada for her "contributions to mechanical engineering research and teaching, and for championing women in science and engineering." She was made a Knight of the National Order of Quebec in 2020.

On September 21, 2019, she was awarded an honorary doctorate from the Université de Sherbrooke.

== See also ==
- Karim Zaghib
- Prix Lionel-Boulet
