= Karim Zaghib =

Algerian-Canadian electrochemist

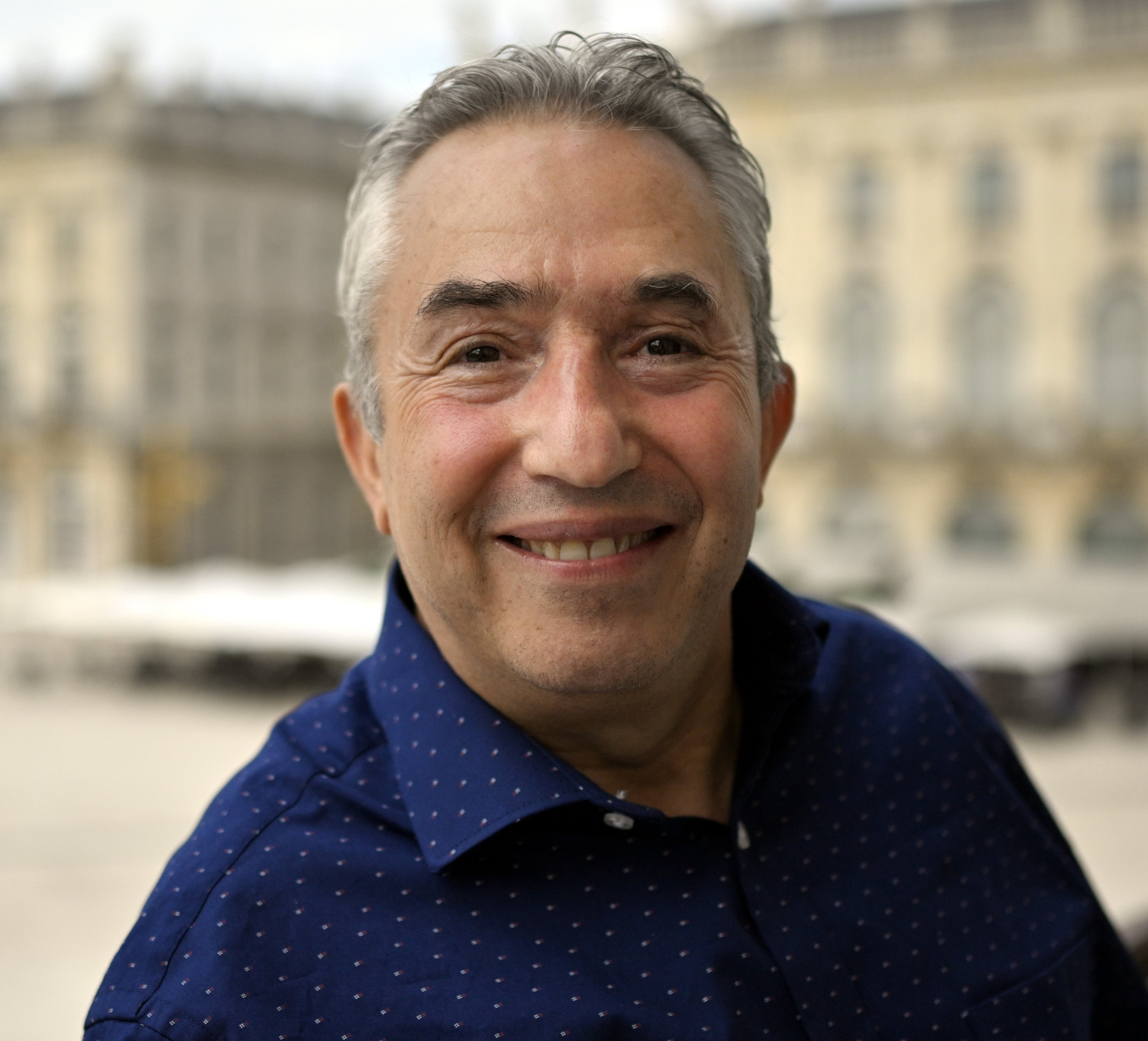
- Born: 25 December 1963 (age 62); Constantine, Algeria
- Citizenship: Algerian, Canadian
- Education: Grenoble Institute of Technology (DEA, PhD); Pierre et Marie Curie University (HDR)
- Scientific career
- Fields: Lithium-ion battery; Lithium-polymer battery; Electrochromics; Carbon
- Workplaces: Ministry of International Trade and Industry (Japan); Hydro-Québec Research Institute; Concordia University
- Thesis: Analyse de la cinétique de cémentation du cuivre par le zinc en milieu sulfate
- Doctoral advisor: Bernadette Nguyen

Karim Zaghib OC FRSC FCAE (born in 1963) is an Algerian-Canadian electrochemist and materials scientist known for his contributions to the field of energy storage and conversion. He is currently Professor of Chemical and Materials Engineering at Concordia University. As former director of research at Hydro-Québec, he helped to make it the world’s first company to use lithium iron phosphate in cathodes, and to develop natural graphite and nanotitanate anodes.

== Early life and education ==
Karim Zaghib was born in Constantine and grew up in Setif, Algeria. He obtained the D.E.A. degree in 1987 and the Ph.D. degree in Electrochemistry under the direction of Prof. Bernadette Nguyen in 1990, both from the Grenoble Institute of Technology, and the Habilitation degree in Physics from Pierre and Marie Curie University (Paris VI) in 2002.

== Career ==
From 1990 to 1992, Karim Zaghib was a postdoctoral fellow at CNRS and Saft investigating chemical lithiation of graphite and carbon fibers under the direction of Professor Rachid Yazami, a research Director at CNRS. From 1992 to 1995, he was a guest researcher working on lithium-ion batteries for the Ministry of International Trade and Industry of Japan at the Osaka National Research Institute. Following his research in Japan, he joined in 1995 the Hydro-Québec Research Institute where he was instrumental in introducing Li-ion technology to the company. He was promoted Director of the Energy Storage and Conversion Division of the company in 2007. In 2017, he founded the Center of Excellence in Transportation Electrification and Energy Storage of Hydro-Québec. In 2014, Karim Zaghib co-founded Esstalion Technologies, a joint-venture between Sony and Hydro-Québec which aimed to research and develop large-scale energy storage systems for power grids. From 2020 to 2021, he was a strategic advisor at Investissement Québec on the Government of Québec initiative to establish a battery industry from mining to electric vehicles and concurrently Professor of Practice at McGill University in the Department of Mining and Materials Engineering. In 2022, he joined Concordia University as Professor of Chemical and Materials Engineering.

== Research ==
Karim Zaghib’s research concerns rechargeable batteries, electrochromic devices and electrochemistry of carbon materials. During his PhD studies, he developed aluminium-manganese-lithium alloys in molten salts as negative electrode for lithium-ion batteries and investigated the copper and zinc displacement reaction. He published a new method to enhance the electrodeposition of metals (electrolysis aided cementation) in Electrochimica Acta. Dr Zaghib’s first paper on carbon fibers as negative electrode for lithium ion batteries co-authored by Prof. Rachid Yazami and Dr. Marc Deschamps was published in 1994 in the Journal of Power Sources. In the context of the New Sunshine Project, he developed vapor grown carbon fibers as a negative electrode, and identified additives and solid polymer and gel electrolytes for Li-ion batteries with DKS, Japan.

At Hydro-Québec, Karim Zaghib started a collaboration with Prof. Michel Armand on new battery materials and electrolytes and with Prof. Kim Kinoshita from Lawrence Berkeley National Laboratory to understand the oxidation and irreversible capacity loss versus the particle size of natural graphite by proposing several models to consider the role of the basal plane and edge sites. He introduced nanostructured Li_{4}Ti_{5}O_{12} (LTO) anodes for lithium-ion and solid-state batteries and new solid Li-ion batteries based on expanded metal with solid polymer or gel electrolyte in combination with 3V and 4V cathode materials and LTO. His collaboration with Prof. Armand led to the invention of the hybrid supercapacitor using LTO negative and carbon positive electrodes, the carbon-coated LiFePO_{4} cathode which enabled the commercial lithium iron phosphate battery, and the LiFSI class of ionic liquids and electrolytes.

During the last 28 years, Karim Zaghib has actively collaborated with Chemistry Nobel Prize Laureate 2019 Prof. John B. Goodenough from the University of Texas at Austin, Prof. Michel Armand, and Prof. Christian Julien and Prof. Alain Mauger from Sorbonne University to develop olivine and silicate cathode materials for Li-ion batteries. Hydro-Québec and the University of Texas at Austin partnered to commercialize the LiFePO_{4} cathode. Karim Zaghib also collaborated with Dr Michael Thackeray from Argonne National Laboratory on the commercialization of spinel lithium nanotitanate (LTO) anodes.

Karim Zaghib is a co-inventor of 600 patents associated to 62 licenses. He has participated in more than 420 referred articles and 22 monographs and co-wrote the reference textbook Lithium Batteries: Science and Technology published by Springer, also translated into Chinese. His publications has been highly cited, with an h-index of 83 as of 2023, according to Google Scholar.

== Awards and honours ==
Karim Zaghib has received numerous national and international awards, including:

- International Electric Research Exchange (IERE) Research Award 2008
- Energy Technology Division Research Award 2010 of The Electrochemical Society
- International Battery Association Research Award 2010
- Elected Fellow of The Electrochemical Society in 2011
- Battery Technology Division Award 2013 of The Electrochemical Society
- Listed among the World’s Most Influential Scientific Minds/Highly Cited Researchers 2015, 2016, 2017, Thomson Reuters and Clarivate Analytics
- Elected Fellow of the Canadian Academy of Engineering in 2017
- Québec-Japan Business Prize 2017 from the Québec-Japan Business Forum
- International Battery Association Technology Award 2017
- Prix Lionel-Boulet from the Government of Québec
- Elected Fellow of the Royal Society of Canada in 2021
- Kalev Pugi Award 2022 from the Society of Chemical Industry
- Officer of the Order of Canada, 2025

== See also ==
- Prix Lionel-Boulet
- Lithium iron phosphate battery
- Lithium nickel manganese cobalt oxides
