= David Weisstub =

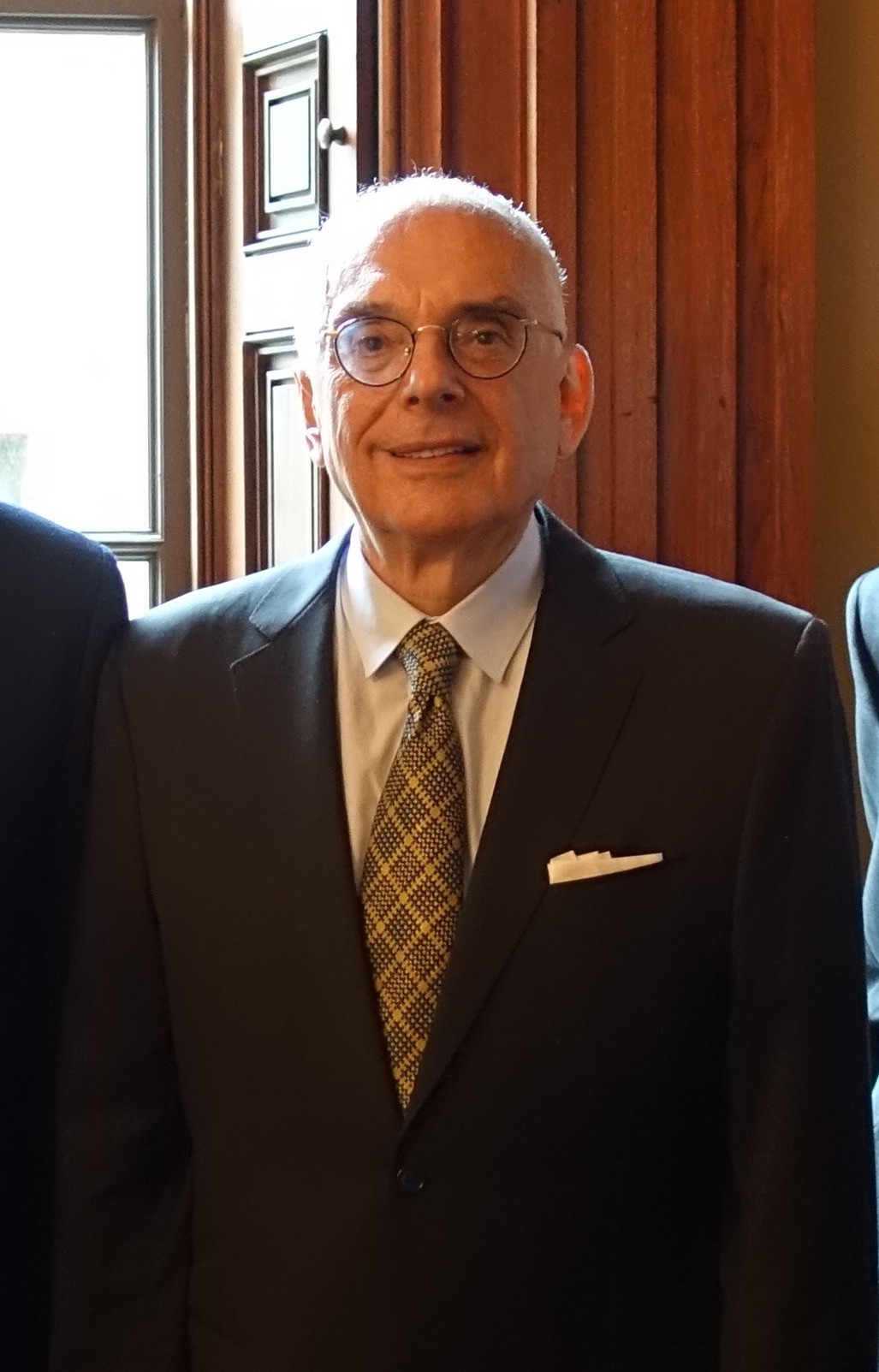

David Norman Weisstub OC (born 1944) is the Philippe Pinel professor of legal psychiatry and biomedical ethics at the Université de Montréal. He is the founder and honorary life president of the International Academy of Law and Mental Health(IALMH). He is also the co-president of the International Academy of Medical Ethics and Public Health(IAMEPH), which he co-founded in 2016. He is the editor-in-chief of the International Journal of Law and Psychiatry, as well as co-editor of the Ethics, Medicine, and Public Health journal and of Springer's International Library of Ethics, Law, and the New Medicine. He also sits on the editorial board of the Journal of Ethics in Mental Health.

He is the father of two sons, Jonathan and Jeremy Weisstub.

== Career highlights ==
A graduate of Yale Law School, Weisstub taught at York University's Osgoode Hall Law School for 19 years and at University of British Columbia's Faculty of Law for one year (fall 1978 to spring 1979) before moving to the Université de Montreal in 1993. He was awarded honorary doctorates by the University of Liège, the Sigmund Freud University (2015) and by the Law Society of Upper Canada (2016). He is a Senior Fellow of the Raoul Wallenberg Centre for Human Rights.

Over the course of his career, he received numerous honours and awards. He has been made a Officier of the Légion d'honneur in France, a Knight of the Order of the Dutch Lion in the Netherlands, and Grande Ufficiale in Italy. In 2016, he was the recipient of the Jean Bernard Award from the French and Francophone Society of Medical Ethics in Paris and of the Bruno Callieria Award from the Sapienza University in Rome. He was awarded a gold medal in 2017 by Charles University in Prague.

In 2019, he was awarded an Honorary Doctorate, 3rd Cycle, Ph.D. in International Law by the Universita Popolare degli Studi di Milano as well as an Honorary Doctorate in Theology by the University of Theology and Spirituality. In 2022, he was awarded an honorary doctorate in medical sciences by the Charles University of Prague.

David Weisstub is also a poetry enthusiast and has published two poetry books. His first book, Heaven Take my Hand, published in 1968, was anthologized in various books and translated. In 2016, he published his second poetry book, The Four Corners.

He was made an Officer of the Order of Canada in 2025.
