= Albert D. Friesen =

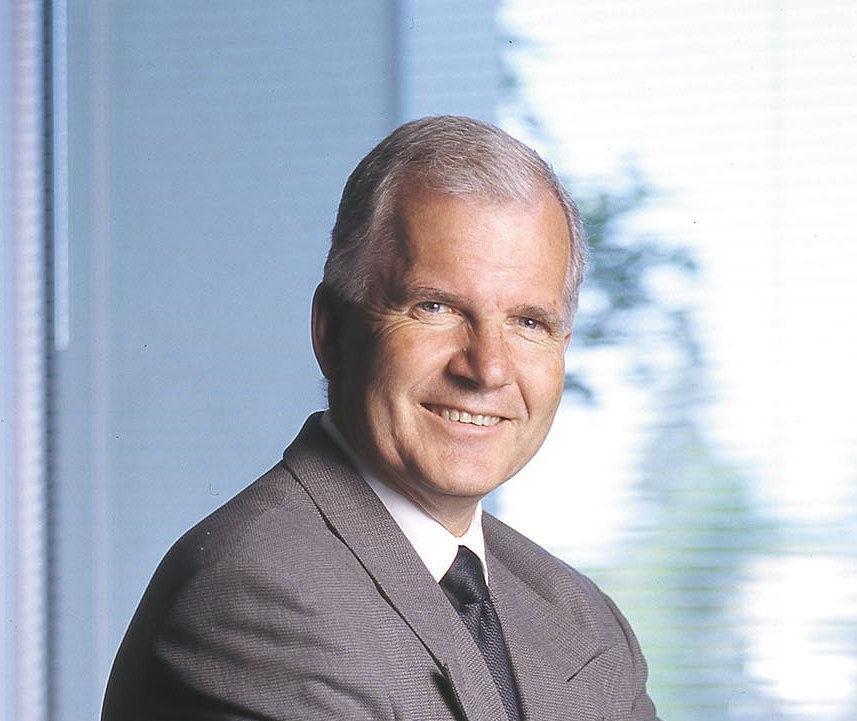
- Born: May 19, 1947 (age 79)
- Occupations: President and CEO
- Employer: Medicure Inc.
- Known for: WinRho

Albert David "Bert" Friesen, OC OM (born May 19, 1947) is a Canadian biotechnologist involved in biotechnology innovation. His biotechnology career began as the first full-time employee of the Winnipeg Rh Institute, where he later became president and CEO, and led the development of WinRho, one of Canada's first successful biotech products.

== Education ==
Albert Friesen went to the University of Manitoba and earned a Ph.D. in protein chemistry.

== Career ==
In 1987, Dr. Friesen was a founder and the company’s first board of directors Chairman at the Industrial Biotechnology Association of Canada (IBAC) which is now known as BIOTECanada.

In 1997, Friesen founded Medicure, which sells a large number of cardiovascular products. In 2020, Medicure purchased Marley Drug and the company can now sell medications directly to patients.

From 2014-2017, Friesen was chair on the International board of MEDA (Mennonite Economic Development Associates).

In March 2023, Dr. Friesen was awarded Outstanding Leadership in Bioscience of the Year at the Annual Bioscience Association Manitoba (BAM) gala.

He was made an Member of the Order of Canada in 2025.
