= Prix Lionel-Boulet =

The Prix Lionel-Boulet is an award by the Government of Quebec that is part of the Prix du Québec, which "goes to researchers who have distinguished themselves through their inventions, their scientific and technological innovations, their leadership in scientific development, and their contribution to Québec's economic growth". It is named in honour of Lionel Boulet.

== Winners ==
- 1999 - Robert Zamboni
- 2000 - Bernard Coupal
- 2001 - Morrel P. Bachynski
- 2002 - Pierre-Claude Aïtcin
- 2003 - Lorne Trottier
- 2004 - Esteban Chornet
- 2005 - Henry Buijs
- 2006 - Yvan Guindon
- 2007 - Maher Boulos
- 2008 - Ghyslain Dubé
- 2009 - André Gosselin
- 2010 - Michael Florian
- 2012 - Louis-Philippe Vézina
- 2013 - Roger Lecomte
- 2014 - François Soumis
- 2015 - Tony Falco
- 2016 - Michel Drouet
- 2017 - Peter Tsantrizos
- 2018 - Jean Caron
- 2019 - Karim Zaghib
- 2020 - Claire Deschênes
- 2021 - Patrice J. Mangin
- 2022 - Michel Gauthier
- 2023 - Richard Boudreault

Source: Les Prix du Québec

== See also ==
- List of general science and technology awards
- Karim Zaghib
