= Carol Kendall (scientist) =

Biogeochemist

- Education: University of Maryland at College Park
- Scientific career
- Thesis: Impact of isotopic heterogeneity in shallow systems on modeling of stormflow generation (1993)
- Doctoral advisor: Phil Candela

Carol Kendall is a hydrologist known for her research tracking nutrients and contaminants in aquatic ecosystems using isotopic tracers.

== Education and career ==
From the University of California, Riverside, Kendall earned a B.S. in geology (1973) and a masters in geology (1976). Following her masters she took a position as a geochemist at California Institute of Technology where she remained until 1979. From 1980 until 1990, Kendall was a research hydrologist at the United States Geological Survey in Reston, Virginia. While working full-time, she earned a Ph.D. from the University of Maryland, College Park. Starting in 1990, Kendall was the project lead for the National Research Program's Isotope Tracers Project within the United States Geological Survey.

== Research ==
Kendall is known for her research combining multiple stable isotopes to track nutrients through ecosystems. Her early research optimized methods to convert water into hydrogen for isotopic analysis. She has worked in multiple ecosystems, including the San Joaquin River, the Sacramento River, and in San Francisco Bay. Her large-scale survey of oxygen-18 and deuterium in water samples collected from rivers across the United States serves as a proxy for modern precipitation. Her research into the carbon and nitrogen isotopes in particulate material provided a baseline for research into food webs, nutrient transport research, and global patterns of nitrogen in soil and plants. Kendall's research has also used isotope fractionation to track the flow of carbon from streams to the atmosphere and to differentiate between sources of nitrogen.

== Selected publications ==
- Kendall, Carol (1 January 1998). "Tracing Nitrogen Sources and Cycling in Catchments". pp. 519–576. Bibcode:1998itch.book..519K. doi:10.1016/B978-0-444-81546-0.50023-9. ISBN 9780444815460. ;
- Kendall, Carol and J. J. McDonnell, Editors (1998). "Isotope Tracers in Catchment Hydrology", Elsevier Science Publishers, 816p, ISBN 9780080929156
- McCutchan, James H.; Lewis, William M.; Kendall, Carol; McGrath, Claire C. (2003). "Variation in trophic shift for stable isotope ratios of carbon, nitrogen, and sulfur". Oikos. 102 (2): 378–390. Bibcode:2003Oikos.102..378M. doi:10.1034/j.1600-0706.2003.12098.x. ISSN 1600-0706.
- Coplen, Tyler B.; Kendall, Carol; Hopple, Jessica (March 1983). "Comparison of stable isotope reference samples". Nature. 302 (5905): 236–238. Bibcode:1983Natur.302..236C. doi:10.1038/302236a0. S2CID 4371648.
- Kendall, Carol; Silva, Steven R.; Kelly, Valerie J. (2001). "Carbon and nitrogen isotopic compositions of particulate organic matter in four large river systems across the United States". Hydrological Processes. 15 (7): 1301–1346. Bibcode:2001HyPr...15.1301K. doi:10.1002/hyp.216. ISSN 1099-1085. S2CID 129144544.

== Awards and honors ==
- Meritorious Service Awards, United States Geological Survey (1994, 2002)
- Fellow, American Geophysical Union (2010)
- Distinguished alumni, University of Maryland (2011)
- Walter Langbein Lecture, American Geophysical Union (2014)
