= Mike Stevens (harmonica player) =

Canadian harmonica player

- Born: Sarnia, Ontario, Canada
- Genres: Country
- Instrument: Harmonica
- Website: mikestevensmusic.com

Mike Stevens OC MSM is a Canadian harmonica player from Point Edward, Ontario. He is best known as a bluegrass musician. During his career he has had hundreds of performances at the Grand Ole Opry. He is also known for his work connecting creative artists with indigenous youth in isolated communities as part of the ArtsCan Circle.

Stevens' harmonica style was described by one reviewer as "multivoiced and blindingly fast".

Stevens entertained at the Central Canadian Bluegrass Awards festival in Huntsville, Ontario in 1998.

Stevens often performs with American fiddle and banjo player Raymond McLain. The duo entertained at the Palmer Rapids Twin Festival in July, 2003. They headlined a concert to raise money for the ArtsCan Circle in Toronto in 2004. They performed together at the Pineridge Bluegrass Folklore Society concert in February, 2008.

== Discography ==
- Harmonica (1990) - Canadian Bluegrass Recording of the Year
- Life's Railway to Heaven (1994)
- Colin's Cross (1995)
- Normally Anomaly (1997)
- The World is Only Air... and a Very Dangerous Hat (2001)
- Blowin' Up a Storm (2002)
- Old Time Mojo (2005) with Raymond McLain
- Black Mustard (2005)
- Piggyback (2009) with Matt Andersen
- Push Record (2011) with Matt Andersen
