= Jeffrey J. McDonnell =

Hydrologist

Jeffrey J. McDonnell OC
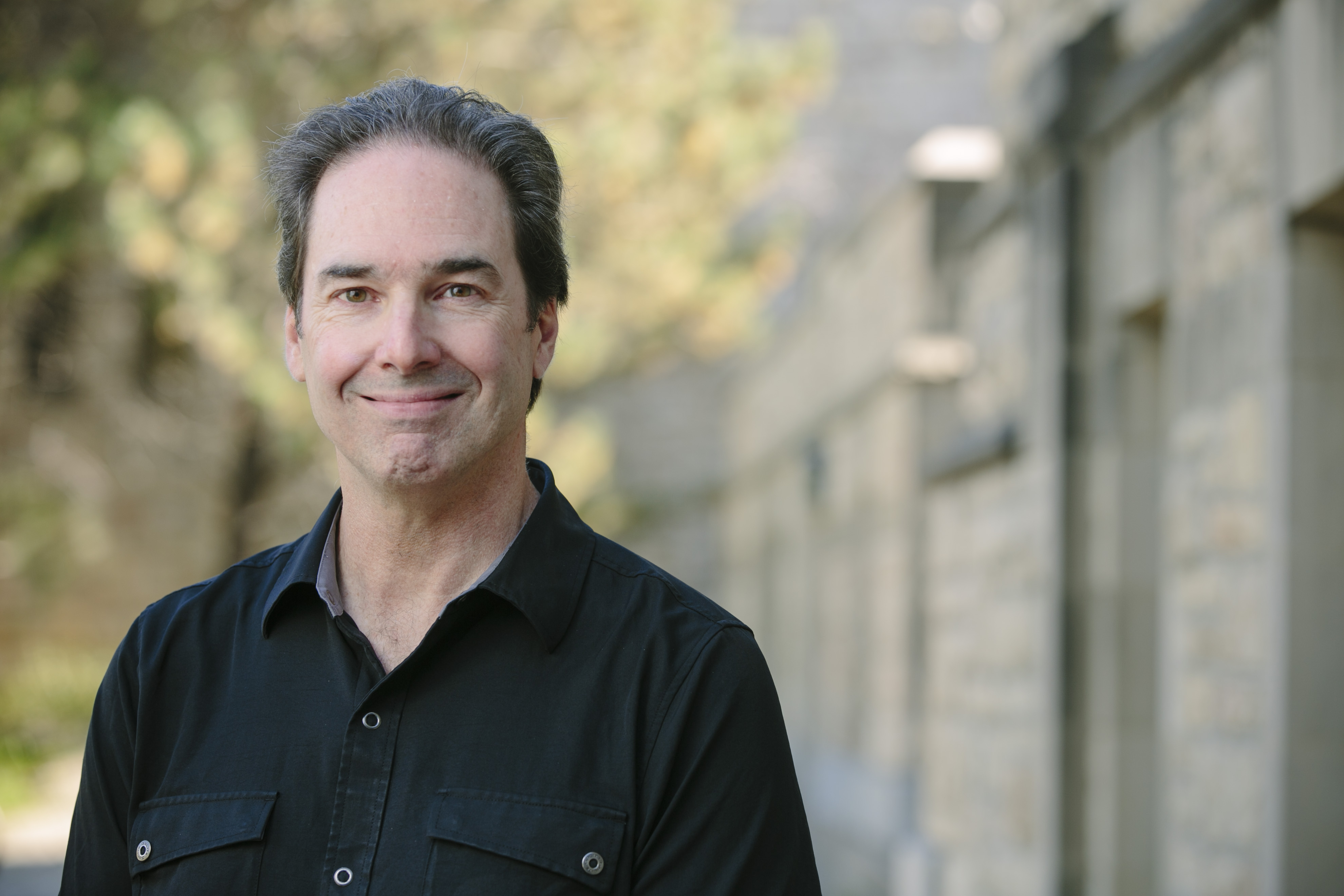
- Jeffrey J. McDonnell in 2014

Academic background
- Education: B.Sc., Physical Geography, University of Toronto; M.Sc., Watershed Ecosystems Graduate Program, Trent University; PhD, 1989, University of Canterbury
- Thesis: The age, origin and pathway of subsurface stormflow in a steep humid headwater catchment (1989)

Academic work
- Institutions: University of Saskatchewan; Oregon State University; State University of New York
- Doctoral students: Holly Barnard

Jeffrey John McDonnell is a Canadian watershed hydrologist. He is a professor of hydrology in the School of Environment and Sustainability and the associate director of the Global Institute for Water Security at the University of Saskatchewan.

== Early life and education ==
McDonnell completed his Bachelor of Science degree at the University of Toronto and his Master's degree in the Watershed Ecosystems Graduate Program at Trent University. Following this, he published his thesis The age, origin and pathway of subsurface stormflow in a steep humid headwater catchment in 1989 at the University of Canterbury.

== Career ==
Upon completing his PhD, McDonnell was a research hydrologist at the NASA Marshall Space Flight Center from 1989 to 1990. Following this, he became a professor of water resources at the State University of New York. In 2000, McDonnell became a professor in the department of forest engineering at Oregon State University. In this role, he taught and researched watershed science, hillslope processes, and hydrological modeling. While working at Oregon State, he was elected a fellow of the American Geophysical Union and awarded the 2009 John Dalton Medal from the European Geosciences Union.

McDonnell eventually left Oregon State and joined the faculty at the University of Saskatchewan in 2012. There he accepted two appointments; one as a professor of hydrology in the School of Environment and Sustainability and another as the associate director of the Global Institute for Water Security. During the 2013–14 academic year, McDonnell was elected to serve as the president of the Hydrology Section of the American Geophysical Union. While serving as president-elect, he was also elected a Fellow of the Royal Society of Canada and awarded the J. W. George Ivany Award for Internationalization.

In 2024, he was appointed as an officer to the Order of Canada. He lives in Vernon, British Columbia.
