= Institut de recherche d'Hydro-Québec =

Canadian research institute

Coordinates: 45°36′55″N 73°23′00″W

L'Institut de recherche d'Hydro-Québec (Hydro-Québec Research Institute), known by its acronym IREQ ("Institut de recherche en électricité du Québec", Quebec Electricity Research Institute) is a research institute established in 1967 by government-owned utility Hydro-Québec. IREQ operates from Varennes, a town on the south shore of Montreal, Quebec, Canada. IREQ operates on an annual research budget of approximately $100 million and specializes in the areas of high voltage, mechanics and thermomechanics, network simulations and calibration.

In the last 20 years, the institute has also conducted research and development work towards the electrification of ground transportation. Current projects include battery advanced materials, including work on molten salts, lithium iron phosphate and nanotitanate, improved electric drive trains and the impacts of the large scale deployment of electric vehicles on the power grid. Projects focus on technologies to increase range, improve performance in cold weather and reduce charging time.

During the 1980s, IREQ built and operated the Tokamak de Varennes, a tokamak device and at that time Canada's largest scientific project. The system operated until 1997 and is now on exhibit at the Canada Science and Technology Museum in Ottawa.

== See also ==
- Hydro-Québec
- TM4 Electrodynamic systems
- Tokamak
