= Monique Frize =

Canadian academic and biomedical engineer (born 1942)

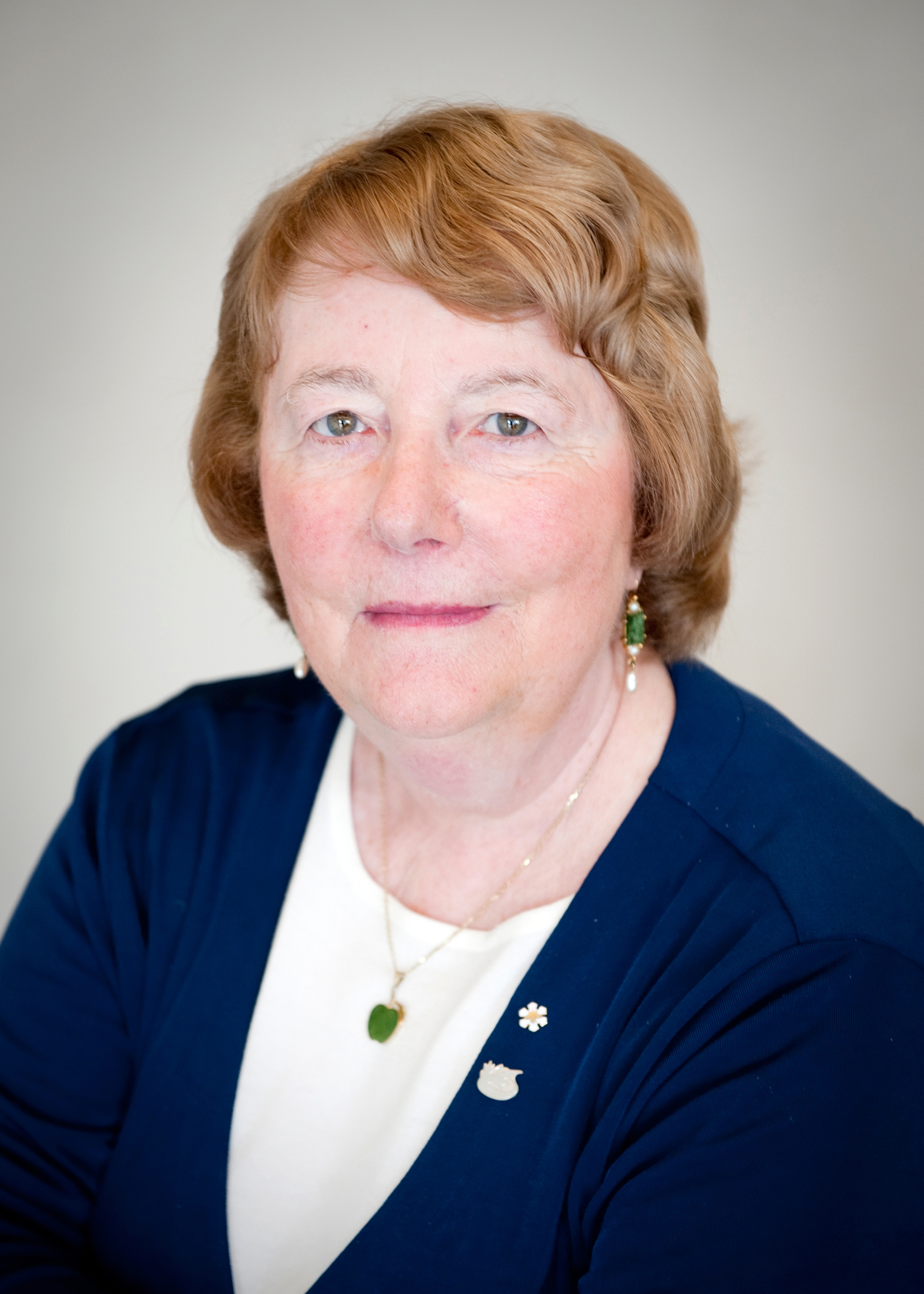
- Frize receiving PEO's and OSPE's Gold medal in fall 2000.
- Born: 7 January 1942 (age 84); Montreal, Quebec
- Occupations: Distinguished Research Professor, Professor Emerita
- Known for: Biomedical Engineering and Women in Science Outreach/Promotion
- Honours: Order of Canada, Fellow IEEE, Fellow CAE, Fellow EC, Fellow IUPESM, Fellow CMBES

Monique Frize, OC, née Aubry (born 7 January 1942) is a Canadian biomedical engineer and professor, knowledgeable in medical instruments and decision support systems. Notably, her scientific research and outreach efforts led her to receive the prestigious distinction of Officer of the Order of Canada.

== Education ==
Born in Montreal, Quebec, Frize received a Bachelor of Applied Science (B.A.Sc.) degree in Electrical Engineering from the University of Ottawa in 1966 - the first Canadian woman to graduate from this program at the university. From 1967 to 1969, Frize was an Athlone Fellow as she completed her Master of Philosophy (M.Phil.) degree in Engineering in Medicine from Imperial College of Science and Technology in London. In 1986, she received a Master's in Business Administration (MBA) degree from the Université de Moncton. She received her Ph.D. degree from Erasmus Universiteit in Rotterdam in 1989.

== Career ==
=== Industry ===
Monique Frize worked as a clinical engineer for 18 years, starting at Hopital Notre-Dame in Montreal, Quebec (1971-1979) before becoming the Director of the Regional Clinical Engineering Service in Moncton, New Brunswick. While in Moncton, she became the first Chair of the Division of Clinical Engineering for the International Federation of Medical and Biological Engineering, from 1985 to 1990 /. Dr. Frize was elected Chair of the Council of Societies of the IFMBE 2015-2022 and a Council Member of the Federation.

=== Academia ===
In 1989, Frize was appointed the first holder of the Nortel-NSERC Women in Science and Engineering Chair (CWSE) at the University of New Brunswick and a professor of Electrical Engineering. In 1997, she was appointed Professor in the Department of Systems and Computer Engineering at Carleton University and Professor in the School of Information Technology and Engineering at the University of Ottawa. She is currently a Distinguished Research Professor and Professor Emerita. She is also a founding member of the International Network of Women Engineers and Scientists (INWES) and was President from 2002 to 2008 as well as being President of the Education and Research Institute (ERI) from 2007. In 2018, in collaboration with Library and Archives Canada and the University of Ottawa Library - Archives and Special Collections, as a member of INWES-ERI, she led an initiative to develop a centre of expertise to document the history of women who have contributed to science, technology, engineering and mathematics (STEM) in Canada. INWES-ERI is now CIWES (Canadian Institute for Women Engineers and Scientists)

=== Scientific research ===
Frize's research interests include medical imaging, medical decision support systems, medical technology management issues (clinical engineering) and technical services for hospitals in developing countries.

== Awards and honors ==
Monique Frize has received numerous awards and honors throughout her career. In 1992, she was made a Fellow of the Canadian Academy of Engineering. In 1993, she was inducted into the Order of Canada, in recognition of being "well-known in the field of biomedical engineering" and for being "a role model and an inspiration for women seeking careers in science". She has received several honorary degrees from the University of Ottawa, York University, Lakehead University and from Mount St-Vincent University. She received the Gold Medal in 2010 from Professional Engineers Ontario and the Ontario Society of Professional Engineers and she became Fellow of Engineers Canada in 2010. In 2013, she was awarded the honour of Fellow of the Canadian Medical and Biological Engineering Society. In 2019 she was a recipient of the Governor General's Award in Commemoration of the Persons Case.

== Publications ==
- A Woman in Engineering: Memoirs of a Trailblazer. University of Ottawa Press, Ottawa, Canada.
