= Jackery =

American portable power company

- Industry: Renewable energy equipment
- Founded: 2012
- Parent: Hello Tech
- Website: jackery.com

Jackery is a consumer electronics brand owned by Shenzhen Huabao New Energy Co., Ltd. The company primarily produces portable power stations and solar energy equipment.

== History ==
The brand was founded in 2012 by Zhuo Sun (also known as Sun Zhongwei). Its parent company initially manufactured battery accessories for mobile devices as an original design manufacturer (ODM). In 2016, the company introduced portable power stations to the market under the Jackery brand. The company sells its products in North America, Japan, and Europe through its official websites, third-party e-commerce platforms, and major retail chains such as Costco.

== Products ==
Jackery's product lines include portable power stations (marketed under the "Explorer" series), foldable solar panels (the "SolarSaga" series), and solar generators. These products utilize lithium-ion or lithium iron phosphate (LiFePO4) battery technologies, and are primarily used for outdoor recreation and home emergency backup.

== Reception ==
In 2023, the Jackery Solar Mars Bot was included in TIME's annual list of Best Inventions. Several products have also received the Red Dot Design Award and iF Design Award.
