= China Sun Group High-Tech =

Chinese materials company

China Sun Group High-Tech Co. Ltd.
- Company type: Public
- Traded as: OTC Pink No Information: CSGH
- Industry: Batteries
- Founded: 2004; 22 years ago
- Headquarters: Dalian, China
- Key people: Bin Wang, (CEO & president)
- Products: Lithium ion battery components
- Revenue: ▲US$25.3 million (2008)
- Net income: ▲US$6.7 million (2008)
- Number of employees: 258 (2008)

China Sun Group High-Tech Co. Ltd., through its operating company, Dalian Xinyang High-Tech Development Co. Ltd (DLXY), is a large producer of cobaltosic oxide and lithium cobalt oxide, both anode materials for lithium ion batteries. According to the China Battery Industry Association, which conducts research of and puts forth reports on the battery industry, China Sun Group has the second largest cobalt series production capacity in the People's Republic of China.

Lithium batteries are becoming widely used due to their power capacity, long service life, and compatibility with carbon cathode materials, necessary for battery circuitry. DLXY's current operations are solely in the People's Republic of China

China Sun Group was put into receivership in 2018 when the Delaware Chancery Court appointed Robert W. Seiden of The Seiden Group as Receiver.

== Dalian Xinyang ==
Dalian Xinyang High-Tech Development Co. Ltd (the "DLXY") was registered as a limited liability company in the People's Republic of China on August 8, 2000, with its principal place of business in Dalian City, Liaoning Province, the People's Republic of China. Its initial registered capital was Renminbi Yuan ("RMB") 5,500,000, contributed by Sun Group High Technology Development Co., Ltd, a limited liability company registered in Dalian City, Liaoning Province, the People's Republic of China, and Ms. Li Zhi, a citizen of the People's Republic of China. Prior to April 2006, DLXY's principal activity was acting as a research center to develop technologically feasible nanometers to be used in lithium batteries and generated no revenue. It was considered as a development stage company. In April 2006, DLXY began production and sales of cobaltosic oxide which is used as the anode of high capacity lithium ion rechargeable batteries. Sales are made primarily to battery manufacturers. Currently, all of DLXY's operations and customers are located in the People's Republic of China.

== Market information ==
China Sun Group trades over-the-counter in the United States under the ticker symbol OTC Pink: CSGH.

On August 24, 2007, DLXY was reincorporated from North Carolina to Delaware and changed its name to China Sun Group High-Tech Co. The par value of common stock of China Sun Group High-Tech Co. is $0.001 per share.

In 2008 China Sun Group was honored with the Leading Enterprise of 2008 China Enterprise Image Award.

According to finance.yahoo.com (year: 2016), the company website is www.chinasungrouphightech.com, but that domain is for sale and the link shows only a test page.

== Development and testing ==
In 2008 China Sun developed a next generation "green" power source in the form of lithium iron phosphate (LiFePO_{4}) that can be built into batteries that power electric cars, hybrids, scooters, and other state-of-the-art electronic devices.

The first batch of lithium iron phosphate energy productions came out of China Sun Group's production lines in April 2009. In June, China Sun Group entered into contracts with four battery production companies to begin testing samples of lithium iron phosphate. Once this testing is complete, the company plans to begin mass marketing the product domestically.

The testing involves running the batteries on the natural attenuation rate curve, which measures the rate of decay over time on a curve. Early reports have indicated that customer testing indicated good consistency with little decay, which is very promising given the market potential for the products in several major Chinese provinces.

== See also ==
- Lithium iron phosphate battery
- Lithium iron phosphate
