= Tanfield Group =

Tanfield Group PLC
- Company type: Public (AIM: )
- Industry: Electric vehicles, aerial work platforms, engineering
- Founded: 2003
- Headquarters: Tyne & Wear, United Kingdom
- Key people: Roy Stanley (chairman)
- Website: TanfieldGroup.com

The Tanfield Group, formerly Comeleon, is a British company that manufactures automotive components and imaging equipment for electric vehicle manufacturing and specialist engineering.

== History ==
The historic company Comeleon made 3D images for mobile phones and other devices. It was absorbed by the Tanfield Group in 2004, and has since expanded to include electric vehicles and aerial work platforms.

Tanfield Group Plc acquired Smith Electric Vehicles (Note: Smith Electric Vehicles, formed in England in 1920, was originally specialized in trolly busses under the name Northern Coachbuilders Ltd. which had also developed a plethora of vehicles including milk floats.) in October 2004, for £2.2m and 1 million new ordinary shares. Tanfield immediately re-started R&D work to develop new electric delivery vehicles, including the Newton and Edison, and targeted a Europe-wide production. In October 2004, Tanfield Group had also acquired Aerial Access (cellular manufacturing solutions).

In 2006, Tanfield acquired the powered access division (scissor lifts and booms) of UpRight International, along with its distribution and sales companies in Japan and the United States. On 28 June 2007, the company acquired Snorkel International as another division of its Aerial Work Platform (AWP) market share.

Tanfield announced the formation of Smith Electric Vehicles US Corp (Smith US) in February 2009 and the company opened for business later that year. In March 2010 Smith US made a £37m conditional offer, equating to 50p per Tanfield share, plus a "free" share in Smith US if it subsequently undergoes an IPO and joins the stock market in the near future.

In the USA, Tanfield started in 2019 a legal battle with Xtreme Manufacturing LLC over the ownership of Snorkel.

== Subsidiaries ==
The group is made up of the following companies:

- Aerial Access (since 2004)
- Jumbotugs
- Norquip
- SEV Materials Handling
- Smith Electric Vehicles (since 2004)
- Snorkel International (since 2007)
- UpRight Powered Access
- Tanfield Engineering Systems Ltd

== TX4E ==
London Taxis International, which manufactures the London black taxi in Coventry, has signed a development agreement with electric vehicle manufacturer Tanfield to develop an all-electric urban taxi. The all-electric version of the TX4 black cab - to be branded the TX4E - will have a top speed of 50 mph (80 km/h) and a range in excess of 100 miles (160 km) on one battery charge.

== Controversy ==
On 3 July 2008 it was announced in the press that the London Stock Exchange was launching a probe after a collapse in the share price. The company was criticised by analysts for poor standards of disclosure and weak financial controls. The shares reached a high of 203.5p (valuing the Company at over £700 million) in July 2007 and fell to 5.53 pence (a value of £20 million). In April 2008, its annual results disappointed the City and raised questions about its disclosure standards and the high level of cash burn.
