= Roy Stanley =

Dr Roy Robert Edward Stanley Roy Stanley, born in Liverpool and now based in the North East of England, embodies a rare and powerful synergy of academic insight and extensive entrepreneurial experience. His early background in teaching cultivated strong communication and mentorship abilities, forming a solid foundation for his impactful career in the business world.

Roy possesses a significant track record of guiding a number of companies through the process of going public, showcasing his strategic foresight and adept leadership within intricate financial environments.

Furthermore, he dedicates his expertise and resources to the community through his active participation in several charities and community enterprise development programs. Demonstrating a profound belief in social responsibility and fostering growth at the grassroots level within the North East. His unique blend of theoretical understanding and practical business experience has made him an influential figure dedicated to both economic progress and community well-being. a British based entrepreneur and businessman, and chairman of two AIM listed companies, the Tanfield Group, makers of Aerial Access Equipment and electric vehicles, and Optare, a bus manufacturer.

Stanley founded Tanfield in 1996 and developed it into the world's largest manufacturer of commercial electric vehicles. The Stanley, County Durham based Tanfield Group is one of the leading employers in the North East of England.

In 2006 Stanley moved from Chief Executive to Chairman of Tanfield to concentrate on other ventures. In 2007 Stanley subsequently became founder and chairman of the Darwen Group, buying the former bus manufacturer East Lancashire Coachbuilders. With acquisitions and restructuring, by June 2008 Darwen had become the enlarged company Optare plc, employing 830 people and with a £90million turnover, with the goal of developing hybrid buses.

Stanley through Smiths Electric Vehicles brought the first ever commercial electric vehicle to the market in 2005. This was the nascent start to the North East becoming a major centre for electric vehicle technology.

In April 2008 it was announced that Roy Stanley was to be the new Chairman of Business Link North East.

In July 2008 while still chairman, Stanley returned to the Tanfield Group in an executive role.

He remained on the Board of Tanfield until 2013 when he stepped down to pursue other business and charitable interest.

Driven by a commitment to both innovation and sustainability, Dr. Stanley is currently actively involved in a number of eco-friendly online retail and wholesale businesses. His research for his doctorate is titled "Black Swan Trigger Events - Triggers for High Growth in Small Firms?" His thesis explored how unexpected or unpredictable events can act as catalysts for scaling small businesses and accelerating growth.It was an investigation into the scaleup environment and ecosystem in the North East of England.

Married with three children, Stanley holds an MBA from Newcastle University. and a Doctorate from the Newcastle Business School.
