= Valence Technology =

Company manufacturer of lithium ion battery modules and packs

Valence Technology, Inc
- Type: Private
- Industry: Electric buses Energy storage UPS; Marine
- Founded: 1989
- Headquarters: Henderson, Nevada
- Products: Lithium ion battery packs
- Revenue: ▲US$ 45.88 million (2010)
- Operating income: ▲US$ 36.44 million (2010)
- Net income: ▲US$ 9.4 million (2010)
- Number of employees: 433

Valence Technology, Inc. was a company that developed and manufactured lithium iron phosphate cathode material as well as lithium ion battery modules and packs. The modules come in 12 V, 18 V, 24 V, and 36 V configurations. Valence's products are used in electric vehicle and plug-in hybrid electric vehicles (PHEVs) such as cars, scooters, motorbikes, and commercial vehicles such as buses, delivery vans and trucks. Valence batteries are also used in wheelchairs, medical carts, robotics, marine, rail, as well as stationary applications such as remote power, uninterruptible power supply (UPS), energy storage systems, frequency regulation and switching gear.

== History ==
Founded in 1989 as a research and development company by Lev Dawson Valence has its headquarters in Henderson, Nevada, and facilities in Las Vegas, Nevada, Mallusk, Northern Ireland, and Suzhou, China. Valence is currently owned by Lithion Battery Inc.

=== Exports ===
The company holds an extensive, international patent portfolio of issued and pending lithium phosphate patents. Valence manufacturers its cathode material and packs in two wholly owned subsidiaries Valence Energy Tech in Suzhou, China.

Companies deploying Valence's battery technology include:

- Segway PT in their Segway Personal Transporter.
- Segway SE-3 Patroller
- PVI – A French Manufacturer developing a range EV platforms exclusively for Renault Trucks, as well as electric buses and other vehicles.
- EVI-USA – A US-based manufacturer developing a range of commercial delivery vehicles, fully electric and hybrid including EviLightTruck
- Enova Systems for the IC Bus plug-in hybrid school buses
- Optare Buses
- Mercedes – providing its lithium battery storage systems for the new Mercedes eVito
- Rubbermaid Medical Carts

=== Recent events ===
In 2009 Valence signed development agreements with Siemens to develop interfaces for hybrid applications in the marine market, and with S&C Electric to develop solutions for the stationary energy storage market

Valence began to focus on Europe about two years ago, when it realized that automakers there already were launching electric delivery vans and hybrid buses.

Among other customers, Valence this year signed sales deals with Smith Electric Vehicles, a UK maker of electric commercial vans and trucks; PVI, a French manufacturer of electric buses and other vehicles; and Oxygen SpA, an Italian company that makes an electric scooter called Cargoscooter. Companies such as Modec, a UK-based supplier of electric delivery vans, and Wrightbus, a UK Wright Group subsidiary that makes double-decker buses, also are testing Valence batteries. Through these relationships, Valence is building connections to large automakers, such as Renault, which is a PVI partner; Peugeot, which is an Oxygen partner; Volvo, which is a Wrightbus partner; and Ford and Isuzu, which are Smith Electric Vehicles partners.

On July 12, 2012, Valence Technology, Inc. voluntarily filed for bankruptcy protection under chapter 11 of the United States Bankruptcy Code in the United States Bankruptcy Court for the Western District of Texas. The company listed approximately $31.5 million in assets and over $82 million in liabilities.

November 13, 2013, Valence emerged from bankruptcy as a private company.

In 2014, Valence entered the marine market by supplying two large battery systems to create a hybrid tug boat.

In 2015, Valence signed a global supply deal with Exide.

In 2018, Lithium Werks acquired Valence.

In 2020, Lithium Werks sold the Valence battery module business to Lithion.

== See also ==
- List of companies based in Austin, Texas
- Lithium iron phosphate
- Lithium iron phosphate battery
- Thermal runaway
