= Gresty Road =

Football stadium in North West England

Coordinates: 53°5′15″N 2°26′9″W

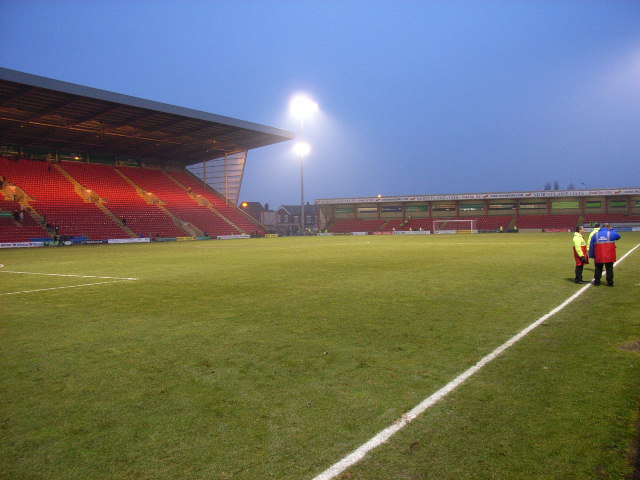
- Interactive map of Gresty Road
- Full name: Gresty Road
- Owner: Crewe Alexandra F.C.
- Operator: Crewe Alexandra F.C.
- Capacity: 10,153
- Surface: Grass
- Record attendance: 20,000
- Field size: 112 by 74 yards (102.4 m × 67.7 m)
- Public transit: Crewe (0.2 mi)

Construction
- Built: 1906
- Opened: 1906

Tenant
- Crewe Alexandra F.C. (1906–present)

Gresty Road, also known as the Alexandra Stadium and currently known as the Mornflake Stadium for sponsorship reasons, is a football stadium in Crewe, Cheshire, England. It is the home ground of Crewe Alexandra and has an all-seated capacity of 10,153.

== History ==
Crewe had initially played at the Alexandra Recreation Ground, also on Gresty Road and located just to the north of the current site. After leaving the ground towards the end of the 1895–96 season the club played at various venues, including in nearby Sandbach, before moving to the original Gresty Road ground, east of the current site, in 1897.

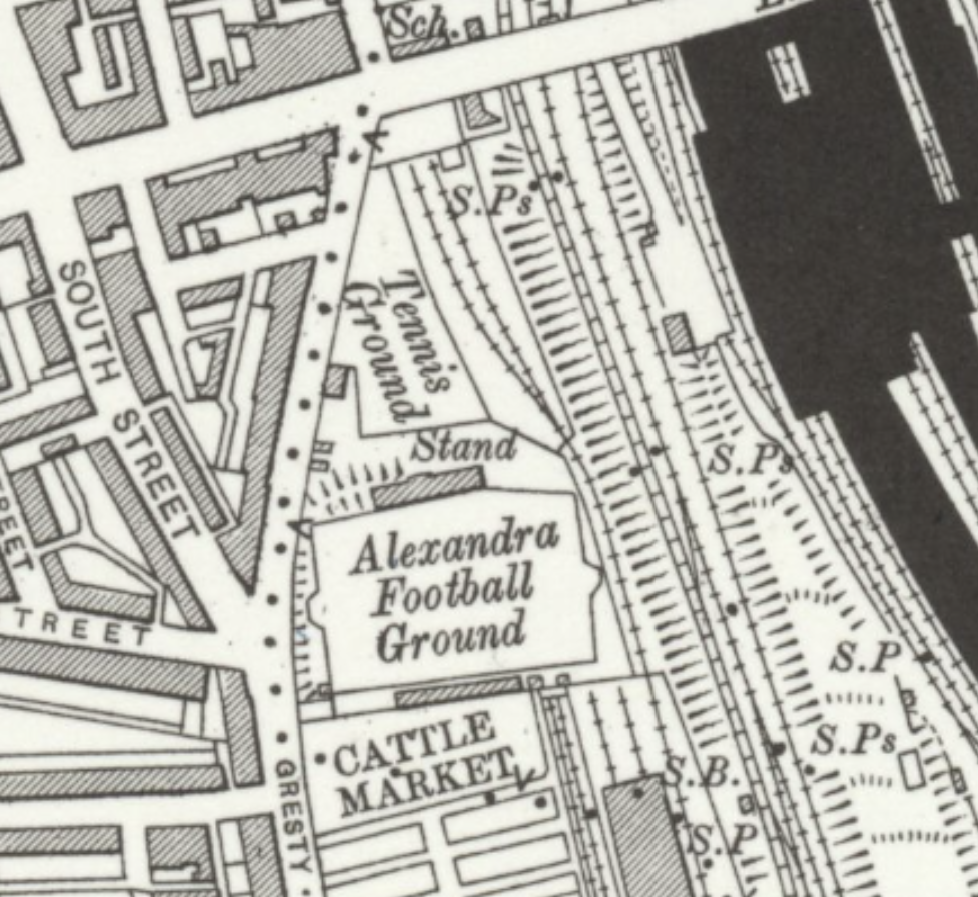
1911 Ordnance Survey map showing Alexandra Football Ground

In 1906, that ground – like the Alexandra Recreation Ground ten years earlier – was demolished to make way for the construction of new railway lines, and a new Gresty Road ground was built on an adjacent site to the west. The new ground initially had a stand on each touchline, one of which had been moved from the first Gresty Road ground, and some embankments around the remainder of the pitch. The pitch runs approximately east to west, with teams playing either towards Gresty Road (west) or towards the railway station (east).

The main stand has always been situated on the south side of the ground. Until the 1990s, the main stand was a wooden structure (built in 1932 after a fire destroyed the original stand) offering the ground's only (wooden) seating plus a standing area ('The Paddock'), while the other three sides were all standing terraces. This configuration saw the club's record attendance when 20,000 people watched the FA Cup third round tie against Spurs on 30 January 1960.

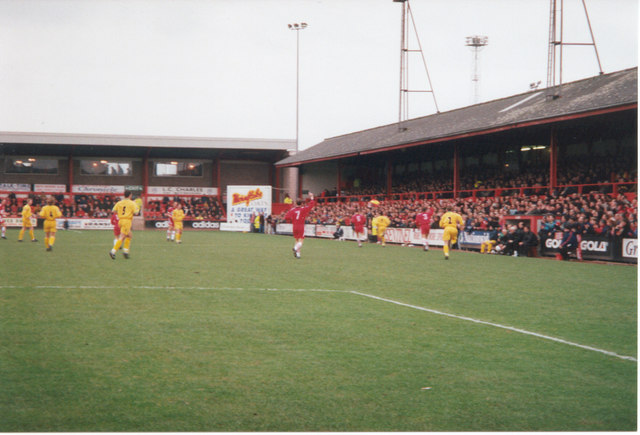
Gresty Road in 1998, looking east towards the Family Stand, with old Main Stand on right

During the 1990s, phased modernisation saw open terracing at the 'Railway End' (at one time a roughly formed 'ash bank' terraced with sleepers) replaced by a new family stand (1993); the 'Gresty Road End' (the main away supporters area) was also replaced by an all-seater stand (1995); and the partially-covered northern standing terrace (the home supporters' 'Pop Side') was replaced by an all-seater stand (1996–97). Completion of the final phase in 2000, including construction of a new £5.2 million main stand, saw some reorganisation of seating allocations; away fans are currently accommodated in the stand along the northern touchline (with the option of additional capacity in the family stand for particularly large visiting contingents). The Gresty Road End and main stand are solely for home supporters. Crewe hosted its first 10,000+ crowd in the all-seater stadium in 2000 with the record attendance of 10,092 when Crewe played Manchester City on 12 March 2002.

In June 2021, the club agreed a £0.5m naming rights deal with long-term shirt sponsor Mornflake; the ground will be called the Mornflake Stadium until 2023-24.

=== Attendances ===
The stadium's location next to Crewe railway station is convenient for supporters travelling by rail to and from games at Gresty Road. From the 1920s through to the 1960s, attendances typically averaged around 6,000, but local derbies could more than double crowds: the visit of Stoke City on 26 October 1926 attracted 15,102, for example, while Port Vale drew 17,883 on 21 September 1953, Crewe's record league crowd. Cup matches against major clubs such as Spurs also drew large crowds (a record 20,000 in 1960). However, league attendances dwindled in the 1970s and 1980s, when seasonal averages of under 2,000 were recorded four times, with the 1986-87 being lowest, at 1,817; just 1,009 watched a 1–1 draw with Peterborough United on 4 February 1986. Crewe's resurgence from the mid-1980s boosted local interest, with 5,000-plus attendances increasingly common, even as Gresty Road's transition to an all-seater stadium began to restrict numbers in the late 1990s; average attendance peaked at 7,741 in 2004 during Crewe's years in the Championship. League Two crowds before the COVID-19 pandemic shutdown in 2020 averaged 4,580, just above their all-time average, 4,576.

=== International ===
On 31 May 2015, the ground hosted an international friendly match between Northern Ireland and Qatar.

31 May 2015 International Friendly	Northern Ireland	1–1	Qatar	Crewe, England
17:00 BST; Match 601	Dallas 46'	Report	Boudiaf 70'	Stadium: Gresty Road; Attendance: 3,022; Referee: Michael Oliver (England)

== Stands ==
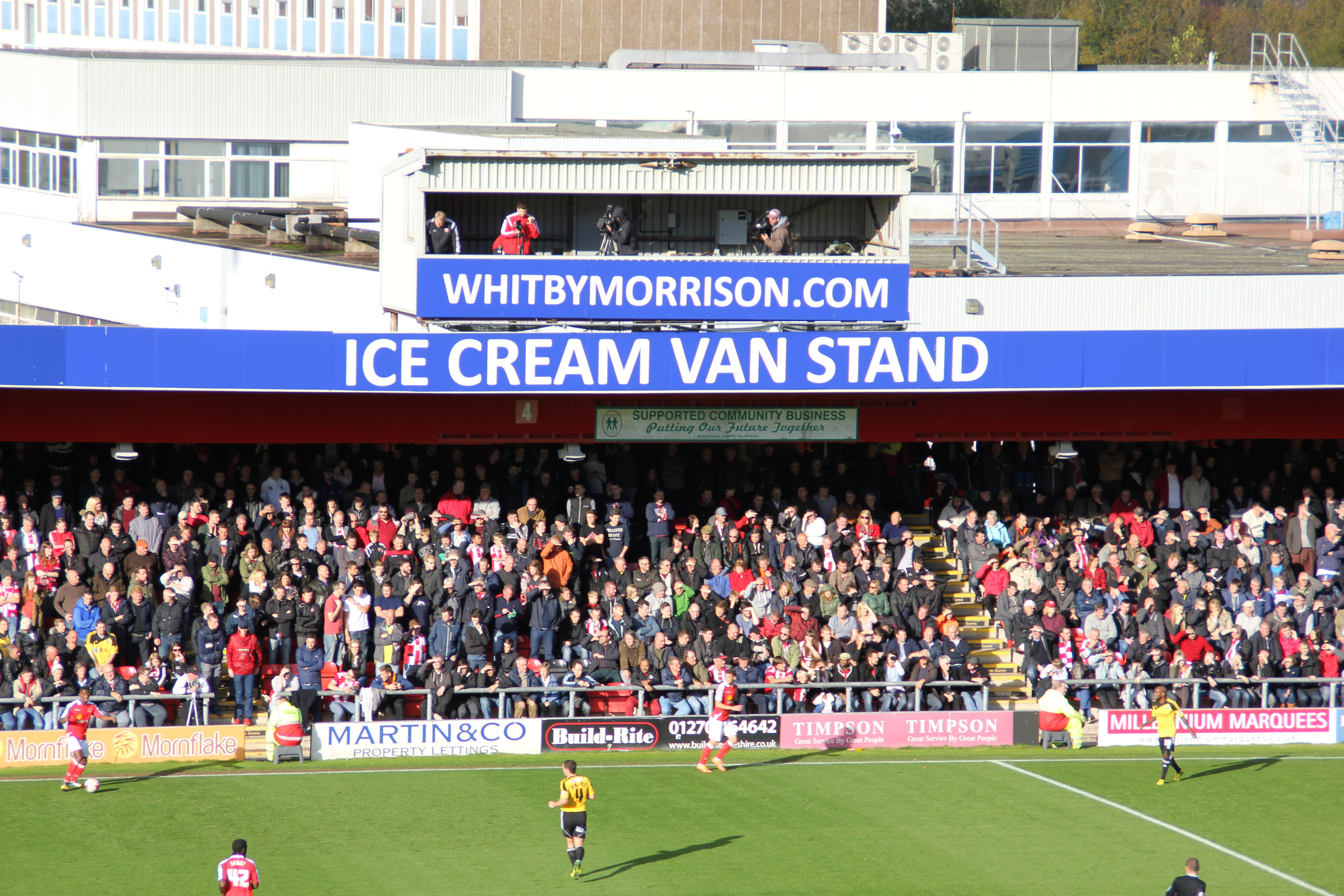
View of Ice Cream Van stand at Crewe Alexandra F.C. stadium

The current stadium, also known as the Alexandra Stadium, has an all-seated capacity of 10,153. It features four stands:

- The "Boughey Stand", or main stand, seats 6,809 spectators and also has a directors area and media seating, and houses the club's offices, team changing rooms, hospitality facilities, ticket office and club shop.
- The "KPI Recruiting Stand", also known as the "Gresty Road End", accommodates 982 spectators and 4 disabled spectators. A bar for home supporters is situated to the north of this stand.
- "The Andrew Connolly Financial Planning Stand", also known as the "Railway End", accommodates 682 spectators.
- The "Whitby Morrison Ice Cream Van Stand", formerly the "Pop Side", accommodates 1,680 away spectators, and also houses the ground's matchday video filming facilities. In July 2021, Whitby Morrison announced a 99-year extension of its stand sponsorship at Crewe.

Should the ground require expansion, the most likely change will be redevelopment of the Ice Cream Van Stand to become a two-tiered stand.

In February 2023, the club announced plans to install 3,000 solar panels above spaces in the car park south of the main (Boughey) stand, with energy to be used to power the stadium or to bring in cash.
