= Whitby Morrison =

Engineering company in England

Coordinates: 53.08511°N 2.42263°W

- Type: Limited company
- Industry: Automotive engineering
- Founded: 1962; 64 years ago (as Bryan Whitby Engineering)
- Headquarters: Crewe, Cheshire, United Kingdom
- Products: ice cream vans
- Number of employees: c. 50
- Website: www.whitbymorrison.com

Whitby Morrison, doing business as Whitby Specialist Vehicles Ltd, is a family-run British engineering company based in Crewe, Cheshire. It has been described as "the world's leading ice cream van manufacturer".

== History ==
Bryan Whitby (13 May 1932 - 1 July 2016), born in Cheshire, started out as a bodywork apprentice at J. H. Jennings in Sandbach, and later did national service in the Royal Army Ordnance Corps. He subsequently worked again for Jennings and at Crewe's Rolls-Royce car works before joining Shavington-based S. C. Cummins in 1955, working on ice cream vans and narrowboats. He worked with Sid Cummins to develop the Direct Drive System, and, after establishing his own company in 1962, filed a UK patent in January 1965 for mobile ice cream producing equipment through which soft serve units were powered off the van's drive mechanism. He built his first ice cream van in 1965. All his ice cream vans afterwards followed this design, previously having a separate electrical generator. This system was known elsewhere as power take-off (PTO), and mostly found on tractors.

Bryan Whitby Engineering Ltd was incorporated on 12 February 1973. In 1989 it became known as Whitby Morrison, after taking over the Electrofreeze business of Morrison Industries based in Sholing, Southampton, and in 1998 acquired the Crewe-based S.C. Cummins brand.

In 2015, Whitby Morrison successfully sued a Yorkshire-based firm for copying its registered ice-cream van designs, including exterior and interior bodywork and the direct drive system; the rogue operator had bought a Whitby Morrison van and reverse-engineered its design to produce 30 fake vans, worth around £2 million, bearing its logo.

In August 2020, two Whitby Morrison vans featured in an episode of the BBC's Top Gear TV show. In March 2022, Whitby Morrison workers appeared in an episode of the BBC regional documentary series, We Are England.

== Operations ==
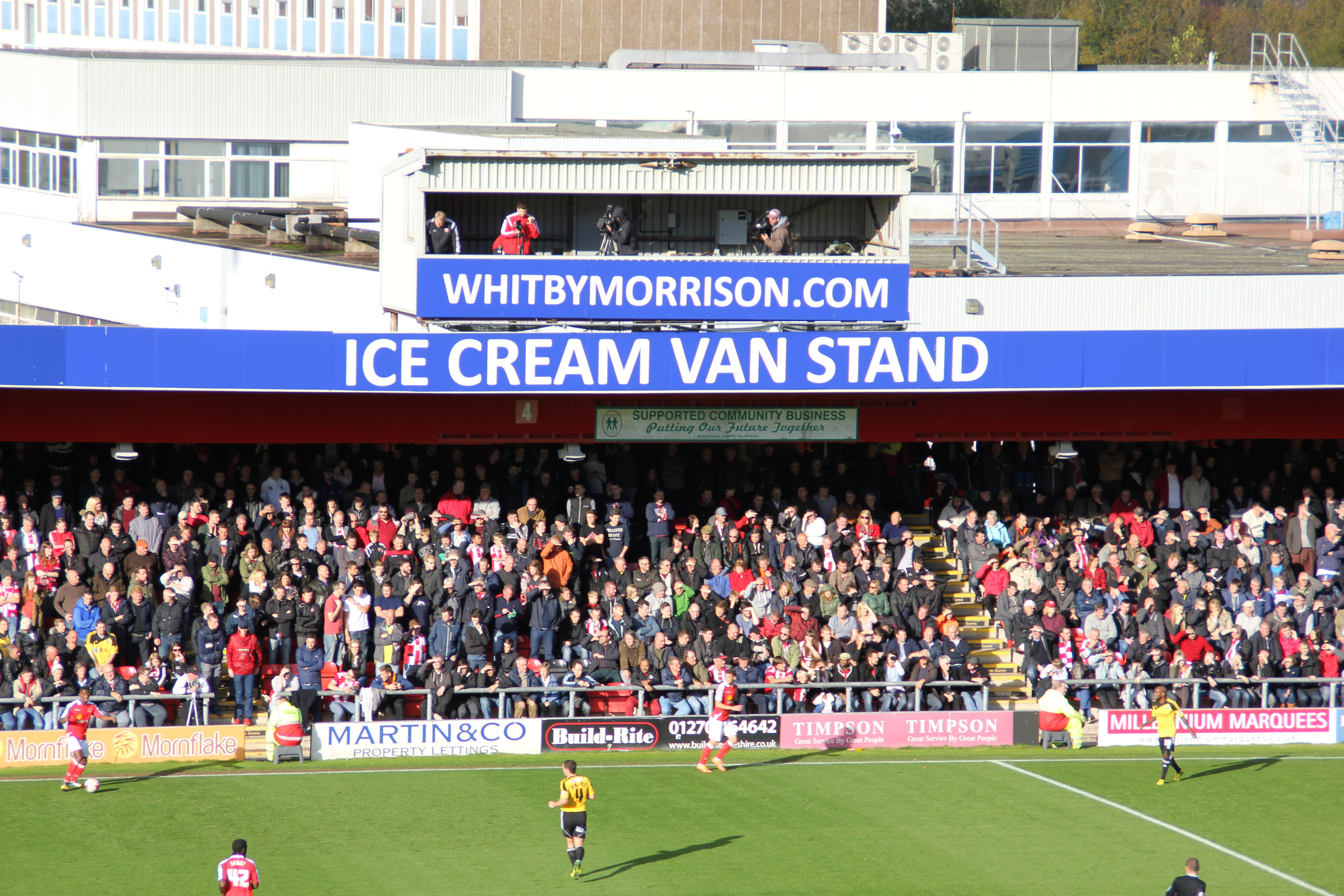
View of Ice Cream Van stand at Crewe Alexandra F.C. stadium

The company's works are situated on Fourth Avenue on the Crewe Gates Industrial Estate in Crewe, off the A532 (Weston Road), approximately 0.5 km southeast of Crewe railway station.

It employs around 50 staff. Stuart Whitby (born 17 June 1957, and son of Bryan), joined the company in 1978, was appointed a director in 1991, and is now managing director; his son Edward (born 5 February 1982) is operations director.

The Whitby family became supporters of Crewe Alexandra in the 1950s and commercial partners in the early 1990s. Since the 2012–13 season, the firm has sponsored a stand, The Ice Cream Van Stand, at Gresty Road, the club's stadium. (Note: Stuart Whitby was appointed a director of the football club in February 2020.) In July 2021, the firm announced a 99-year extension of its stand sponsorship at Crewe. For Crewe's 2024 EFL League Two play-off final at Wembley, the company offered free 99 ice creams from a Whitby Morrison ice cream van at the end of Wembley's Olympic Way. In April 2025, Whitby Morrison was announced as the club's new shirt sponsor.

The company also sponsors a stand at nearby Nantwich Town's Weaver Stadium.

== Products ==
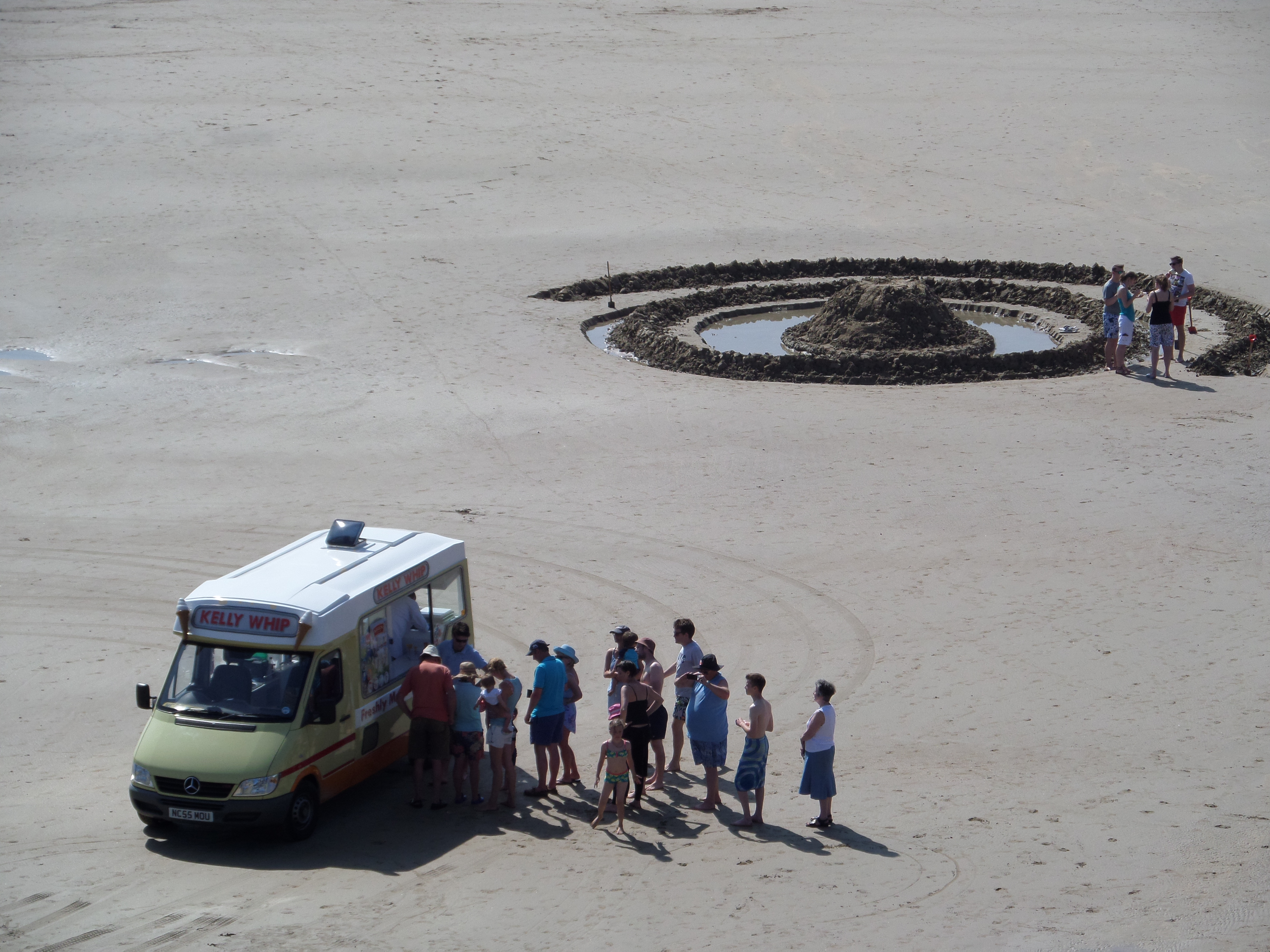
Sprinter van on Polzeath Beach in June 2014

Whitby Morrison converts production vans into ice cream vans for the mobile soft ice cream industry. Their products have been exported to over 60 countries. It has mainly converted Mercedes-Benz Sprinters or Ford Transits, both popular vehicles in the UK. The UK's biggest ice cream van manufacturer, the firm produces around 100 vans a year: 60 new, 30 conversions and 10 vintage van conversions.

All new vans are built on a Euro 6-compliant Mercedes Sprinter chassis, which meets rules for particulates and NOx emissions.

An electric motor-drive (EMD) system is installed in 80% of the vans Whitby Morrison builds, allowing vendors to switch off their engines and use mains electricity to run freezers and other equipment. EMD systems can also be retrofitted to existing vans. The company has also been developing a fully electric on-board battery system to power the Carpigiani soft-scoop machines it fits, meaning vans' engines can be turned off when they are parked. The first all-electric van was expected to be delivered in the summer of 2019.

== See also ==
- Wales & Edwards

== Notes and references ==
- Whitby, Stuart; Earnshaw, Alan (1999). Fifty Years of Ice Cream Vehicles, 1949–99. Appleby: Trans-Pennine ISBN 978-1-903016-08-4
