= Smith Electric Vehicles =

Electric truck manufacturer (1920–2017)

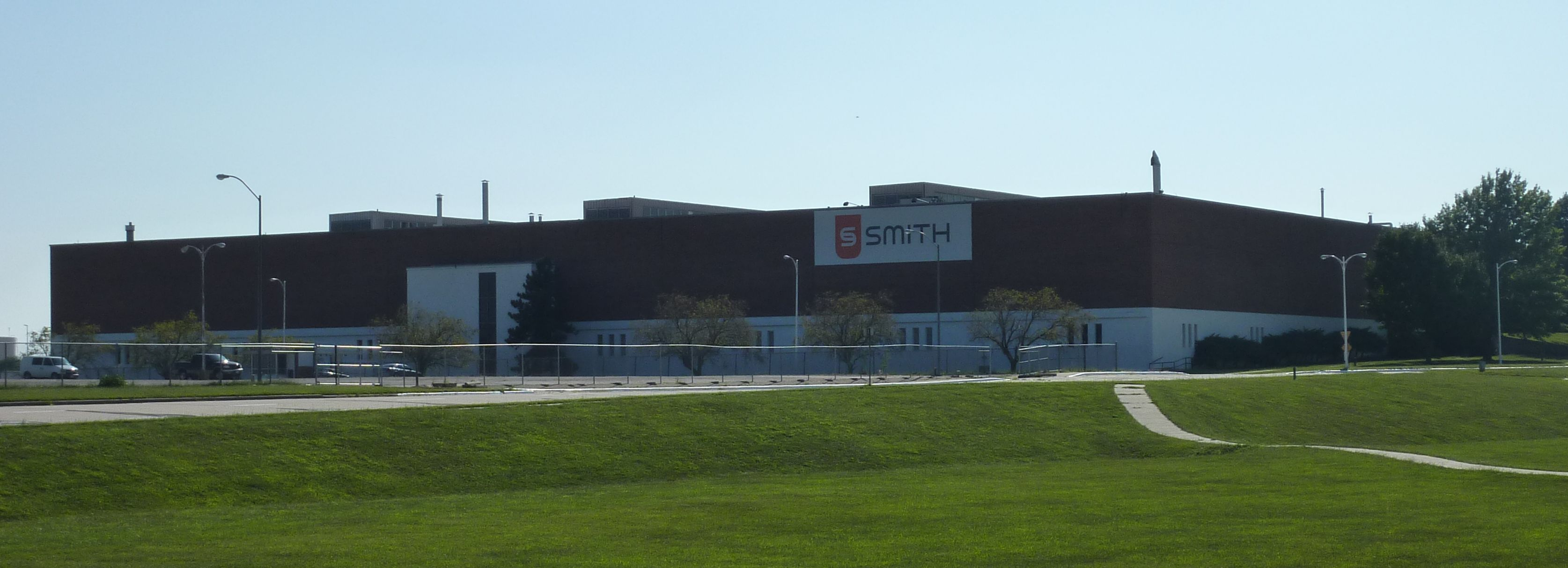
- US headquarters and factory at the Kansas City Overhaul Base
- Type: Private
- Industry: Automotive
- Founded: Washington, Tyne and Wear, United Kingdom. (1920; 106 years ago)
- Defunct: 2017
- Headquarters: Kansas City, Missouri, USA
- Area served: Worldwide
- Products: The Smith Newton
- Website: www.smithev.com

Smith Electric Vehicles (also known as Smith's) was a manufacturer of electric trucks. The company, founded in 1920 in the north of England, moved its headquarters to Kansas City, Missouri in 2011. Smith suspended all operations in 2017.

Smith was a manufacturer of the world's largest range of zero-emission commercial electric vehicles, with gross vehicle weights (GVWs) from 3,500 to 12,000 kilograms (7,700 to 26,500 lb). From 2010 to 2015, the company produced over 800 commercial electric fleet vehicles. Formerly based in Washington, Tyne and Wear, it manufactured vehicles for the European, Canadian, Southeast Asian and US markets.

Smith was formerly part of the Tanfield Group, which trades on the London Stock Exchange's Alternative Investment Market. Tanfield established a Delaware corporation, Smith Electric Vehicles US Corp (SEV US Corp), in 2009 to penetrate the North American market. The company headquarters was in Kansas City, Missouri. In March 2010, the US company indicated that it wanted to buy out its UK counterpart.

After a poor multi-year trading history, Smith's UK branches were shut down. This included Smith Electric Vehicles (Europe), which was put into administration, and Smith Technologies (which entered liquidation).

In February 2017, the company ceased operation due to lack of funding; however, its board was attempting to obtain financing for a reorganization.

== History ==
=== Early years ===
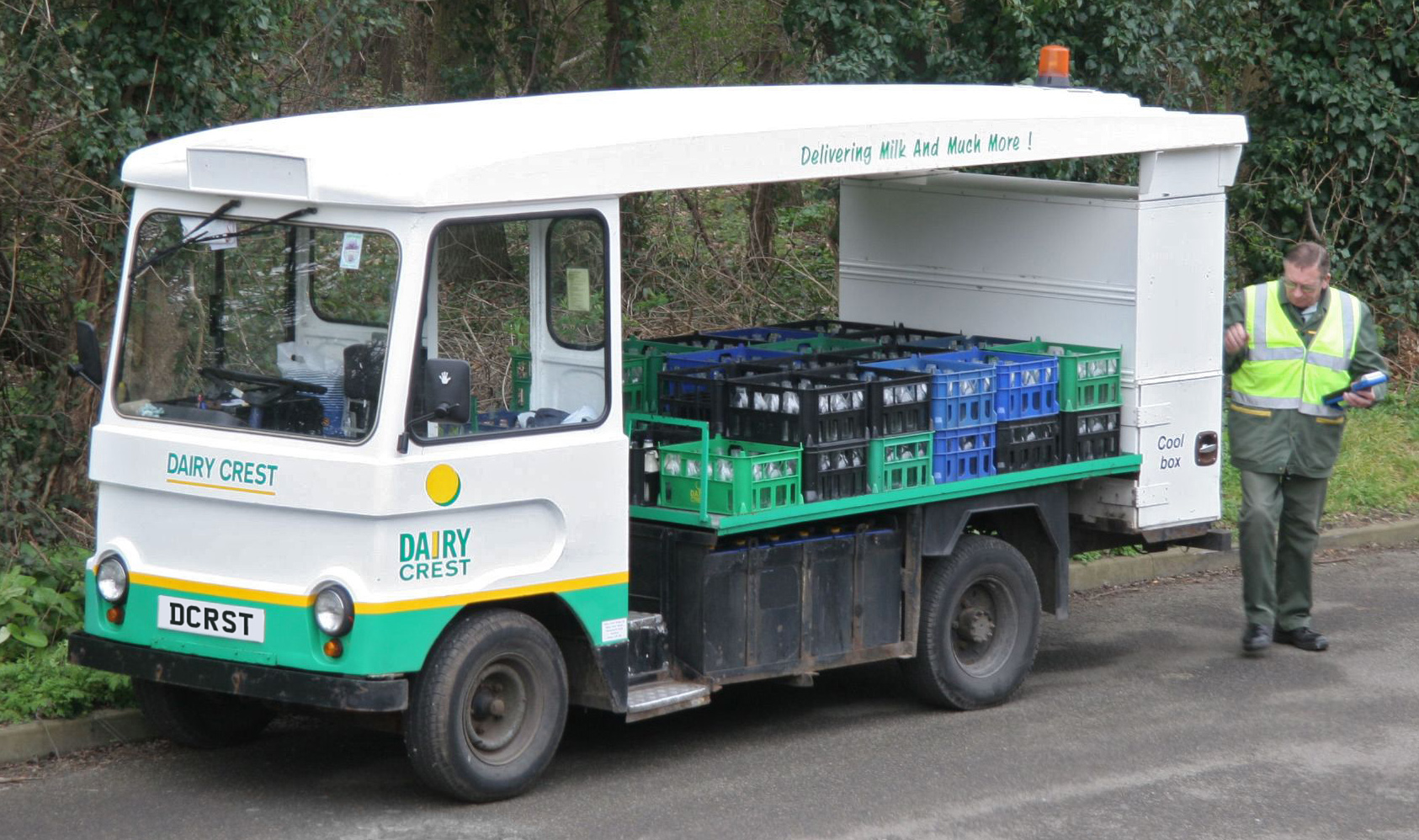
A Smith milk float, the company's most popular type of vehicle from the 1950s to the 1980s

The company was founded in 1920 as Northern Coachbuilders (NCB) in Newcastle upon Tyne. After making a name as a producer of electric trams and trolleybuses, it moved into electric delivery vehicles. The company's electric vehicle and bus production were separated in 1949, with buses continuing to carry the Northern Coachbuilders brand. All NCB electric vehicles were manufactured by Smith Electric Vehicles, which was based in Gateshead. Overall ownership of the company remained unchanged; the electric-vehicle directors were Douglas Smith Sr., Douglas Smith Jr., and H. W. Heyman. The Smith family founded the business, and ran it until 2004. In North East England, the family owns Ringtons Tea.

Smith Electric Vehicles' business in the 1950s and 60s focused on the milk float, a vehicle designed for the doorstep delivery of milk and other dairy products. As dairies phased out horse-and-cart delivery, they opted for near-silent electric vehicles for early-morning deliveries instead of noisier internal-combustion vans and trucks.

Smith launched the Smith Cabac, the first delivery float with a rear-entry cab (so the milkman could exit the vehicle on either side), during the mid-1960s. The company produced four Cabac series: the 65, 75, Jubilee 77 and 85. Smith acquired competitor Wales & Edwards, which manufactured three-wheeled milk floats, in 1989.

=== North America ===
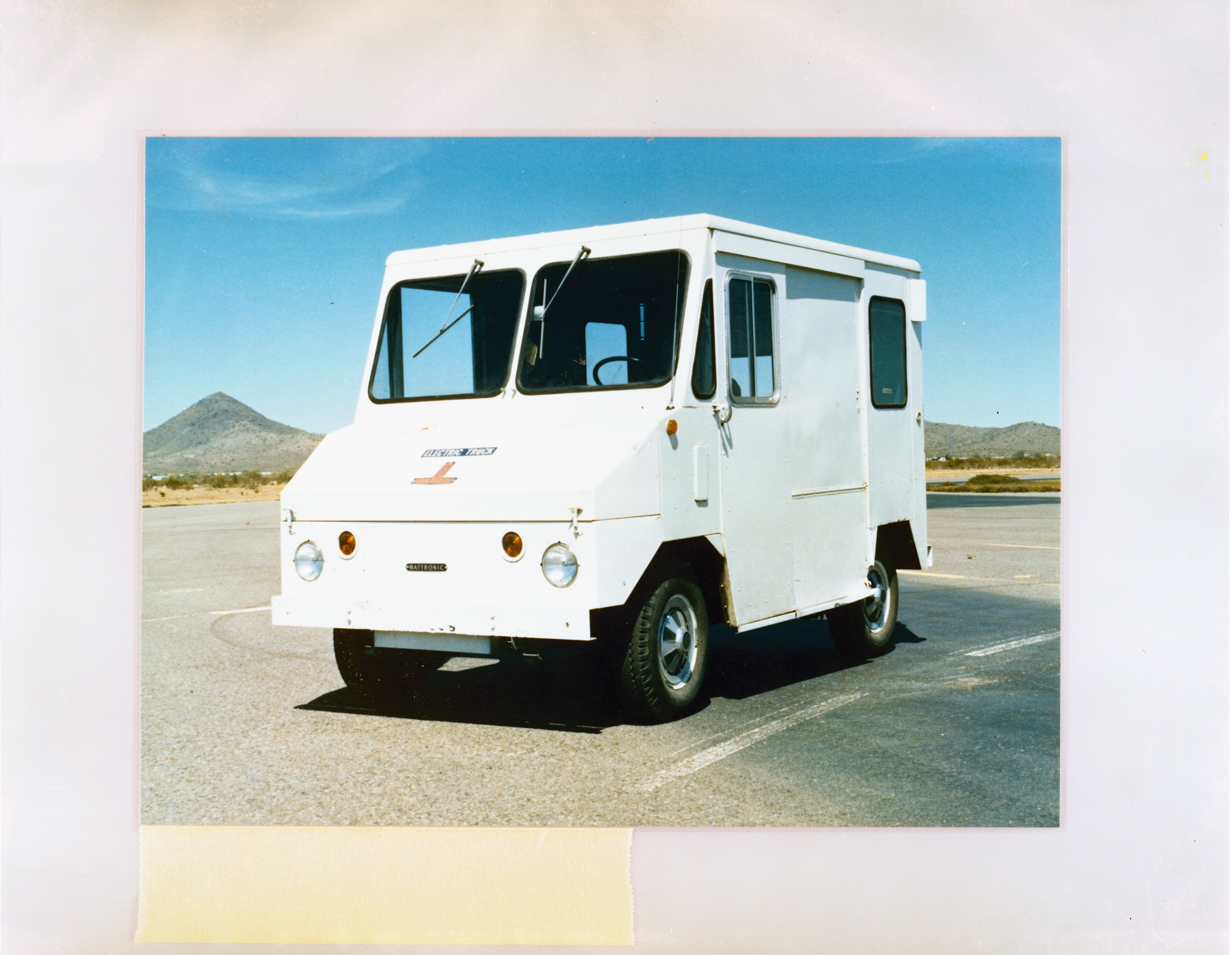
A Battronic electric minivan in 1977

The company took its first steps into North America in 1962. Smith Delivery Vehicles, based in Gateshead, signed a partnership with coachbuilder Boyertown and the Exide Division of the Electric Storage Battery of Philadelphia to produce an electric-powered delivery truck.

The Boyertown-Smith connection was forged in the late 1950s, when Smith's managing director was in the United States to explore a partnership with William and James Conway (owners of Mister Softee, whose mobile ice-cream trucks were built by Boyertown).

Smith obtained the United Kingdom rights to the Mister Softee brand from the Conways, and began producing Mister Softee electric ice-cream floats in 1959 in partnership with J. Lyons & Co. subsidiary Glacier Foods. The Smith family approached the firm with the Battronic proposal in 1962. At that time, there were more than 14,000 Smith Electrics in service across the United Kingdom and western Europe.

The new company was organised as the Battronic Truck Corporation. Exide's parent company was a producer of electric-vehicle batteries, and Smith was a producer of electric delivery vehicles. Boyertown's contribution was its high-strength, lightweight alloy body.

Early Battronics had a top speed of 25 miles per hour (40 km/h), and could carry a 2,500 pounds (1,100 kg) load up to 62 miles (100 km) on a single charge. The Potomac Edison Company of Hagerstown, Maryland, took delivery of the first production Battronic in March 1964. Smith withdrew from the partnership in 1966, and Battronic produced and sold fewer than 200 vehicles over its 20-year corporate lifespan (1963–1983).

=== Diversification ===
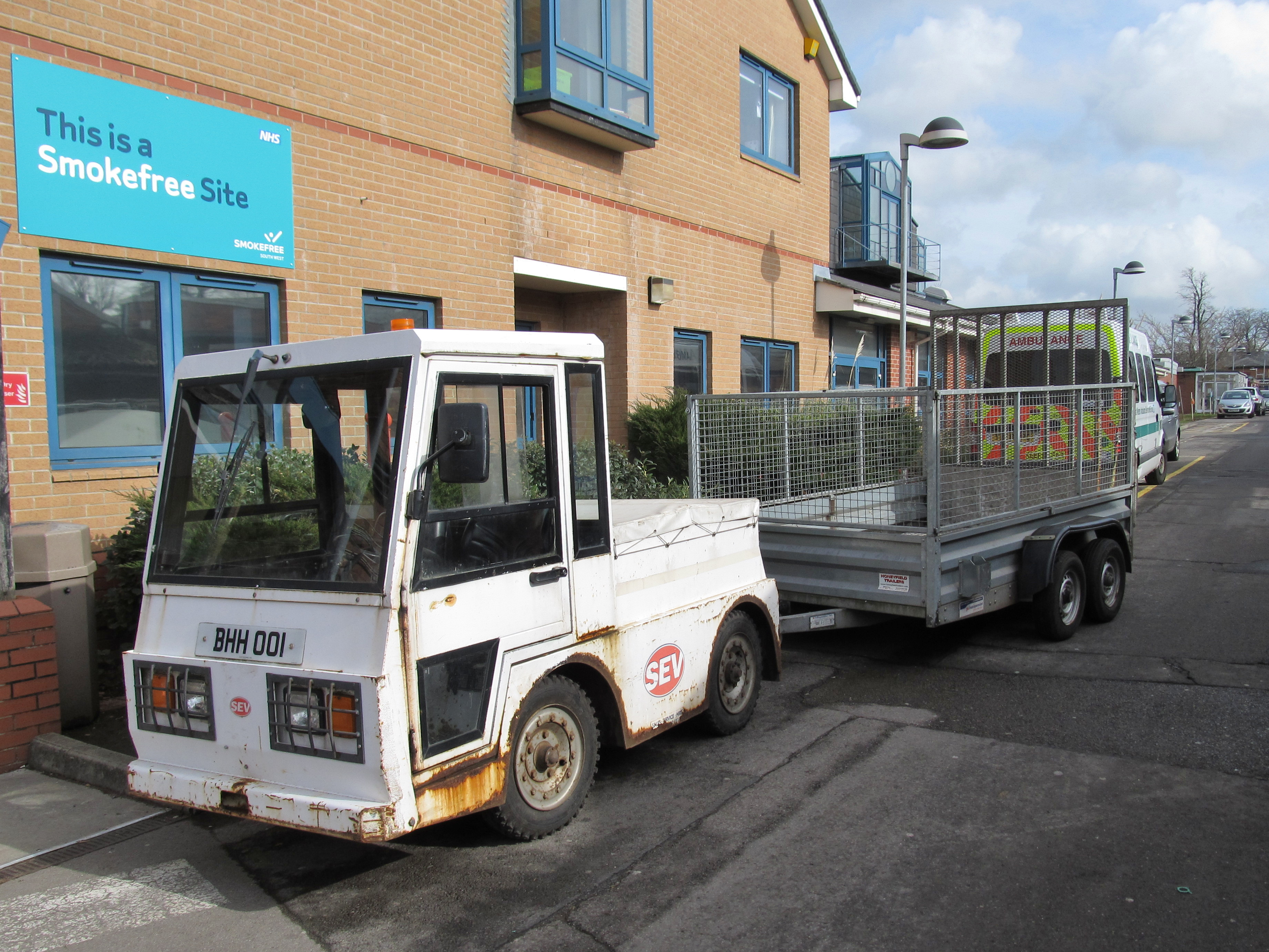
SEV hospital utility vehicle in Bristol

In the UK, Smith had a downturn in orders for its Cabac and diversified into niche vehicles. The Smith ST range of 7.5-ton low-speed electric trucks were marketed for municipal operations and interior applications requiring heavy-duty, emissionless vehicles. Smith ST vehicles are used in nuclear power plants, large factories, and salt mines which have been converted into records-storage facilities. The company re-branded itself as SEV Group and diversified into fleet management, mobile vehicle repair and the sale, hire and maintenance of forklifts and other material-handling equipment.

The Tanfield Group, an engineering company based in North East England, acquired the SEV Group in October 2004 for £2.2 million and one million new ordinary shares. Tanfield restored the Smith Electric Vehicles brand name and began research and development of new electric delivery vehicles.

=== Development ===
The Faraday, a proof of concept vehicle, with a top speed of 50 miles per hour (80 km/h), a range of up to 60 miles (100 km) in urban operations and a capacity of up to 2,000 kilograms (4,400 lb), was introduced in October 2005. Built on a Smith steel chassis, the Faraday had a gross vehicle weight (GVW) of over 5,000 kilograms (11,000 lb). Early adopters, such as TNT N.V. and Sainsbury's, wanted an electric vehicle which better matched UK driving-licence restrictions. In the UK, a person with a valid license can drive a light commercial vehicle with a GVW of up to 3,500 kilograms (7,700 lb); a vehicle between 3,500 and 7,500 kilograms (16,500 lb) requires a C1 commercial-vehicle license.

Smith introduced the Newton 7.5-ton truck, which housed electric drivetrain technology in a chassis by Avia in the Czech Republic, in 2006. Express and mail operator TNT N.V. took the first Newton for assessment in its London fleet. A new Smith Electric Vehicles production facility was built in Washington, Tyne and Wear, and was opened by Prime Minister Tony Blair in February 2007: "This will be a company that will really make its presence felt not just in the North East, but actually throughout the world."

In April of that year, Smith unveiled the Smith Edison. Based on the Ford Transit, it was the first electric light-commercial vehicle with a GVW of less than 3,500 kg – meeting the "everyman" driving-license requirement of UK fleet operators. The first companies to deploy the Edison included the retailer Sainsbury's and the utility company Scottish & Southern Energy. TNT N.V. ordered a fleet of 50 Smith Newton trucks, after its successful trial of the first vehicle in 2006 trial, that month.

Smith was one of several electric-commercial-vehicle companies invited to the Department for Transport (DfT) in London for discussions on how the UK government might help stimulate the market for commercial electric vehicles. This led to the announcement of the Low Carbon Vehicle Procurement Programme in the government's May 2007 Energy White Paper.

During the summer of 2007, Smith produced its first vehicles for export (delivered to TNT N.V. in the Netherlands). In December 2007, the company exhibited its Newton truck in North America and announced plans to establish a US production facility.

=== Corporate restructuring ===
In 2008, Smith appointed its first full-service distributor (Electric Vehicles Ireland). In April, Smith and Ford of Europe announced an "official collaboration" on the future development of commercial electric vehicles beginning with the Smith Ampere (an electric version of the Ford Transit Connect).

By the end of June 2008, the Tanfield Group (Smith's parent company) reported the cancellation and postponement of customer orders. In November, Smith Electric was shortlisted for the Department for Transport's Low Carbon Vehicle Procurement Programme (a subsidy scheme which allowed public-sector organizations to buy electric and low-carbon vans for the same price as an equivalent diesel vehicle).

Electric vehicle sales for 2008 were £25.1 million, down from £26.1 million in 2007. The Tanfield Group cited a combination of supply-chain constraints, fleet-operator spending reductions and a lack of available credit for the decline in sales. The Great Recession also impacted the company's plans to open a production facility in the US.

After restructuring its operations in line with the downturn in demand, in February 2009 Tanfield announced the formation of Smith Electric Vehicles US Corp (Smith US): a joint venture which is 49-percent owned by Tanfield. The 51-percent majority share was owned by private investors and Smith US management. In addition to establishing an associate company in the US, Smith appointed distributors for sales and service in all foreign markets which were offering incentives for electric vehicles.

Smith delivered its first Newton electric truck to Electric Vehicles Ireland, its distributor for the Republic of Ireland and Northern Ireland, in March 2009. The 10,000-kilogram (22,000 lb) vehicle was purchased by building materials retailer Grange Builders Providers of Dublin. This was followed by the appointment of AllGreenVehicles in the Netherlands as Smith's distributor for the Benelux countries.

At the Geneva Motor Show, Ford exhibited its Tourneo Connect, a concept electric people-carrier version of the Ford Transit Connect. The prototype was produced by Smith.

In 2009, the UK government began funding electric vehicles. Smith announced in June that it was a successful bidder for the Ultra Low Carbon Vehicle Demonstrator Programme (ULCVDP), administered by the Technology Strategy Board (TSB), which provided matching funds for the development of demonstration electric passenger vehicles. Smith announced that it would produce a seven-seat executive minibus; 10 London taxis based on LTI's TX4 chassis, and five people carriers similar to the concept Ford Tourneo Connect exhibited in Geneva. In August 2009, the UK government confirmed that Smith was one of three electric-van manufacturers on the final shortlist of suppliers for the Low Carbon Vehicle Procurement Programme.

In November 2009, Tanfield announced that it was terminating its involvement in the electric Ford Transit Connect project in North America and Europe by mutual agreement with Ford. Smith cited the unexpected early success of its Newton electric truck in the US market; since Smith US had orders for 255 trucks, it decided to focus on the Newton. In Europe, Tanfield felt that the market for smaller vans was becoming too competitive.

Smith UK appointed Sime Darby Motors its distributor for Hong Kong and Macau. It received repeat business from Sainsbury's, which ordered an additional 50 Smith Edison electric vans. Combined with Sainsbury's existing 20 electric vans, this created the world's largest fleet of new-technology electric commercial vehicles. Sales of electric vehicles declined from £25.1 million to £15.1 million in 2009.

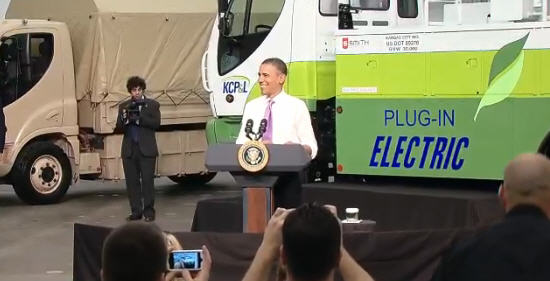
Barack Obama visited the Kansas City plant on 8 July 2010 to announce a $32 million grant under the American Recovery and Reinvestment Act, coupled with $36 million in private capital, to build up to 500 electric trucks.

In 2010, the company supplied 10 Smith Edison vans to Ford of Europe for the colognE-mobil project in Cologne. The first phase of the project would examine the potential benefits of electric commercial vehicles in Cologne, then forecast how they might affect Germany's plans to deploy one million zero-emission vehicles by 2020. In March, ElecTruckCity was appointed as Smith's French distributor.

Phase one of the UK's Low Carbon Vehicle Procurement Programme began in April 2010. Smith received 67 percent of the orders for electric vans, more than double the total of orders received by the programme's other two electric-van suppliers (Modec and Allied Electric). At the UK's Commercial Vehicle Operator Show in 2010, the company celebrated its 90th anniversary. It announced SmithLink, the first telematics system for electric commercial vehicles. This provided real-time data on battery state of charge and vehicle location and the data monitoring required for government-funded projects from the United States Department of Energy and the UK's Department for Transport.

The company introduced the UK's first all-electric 17-seat minibus at the 2010 CV Operator Show at the National Exhibition Centre in Birmingham. The Smith Edison minibus was based on the Ford Transit minibus chassis.

=== Relocation to the United States ===
In 2011, Smith's US subsidiary in Kansas City, Missouri acquired the parent company for $15 million and moved its headquarters to Kansas City International Airport. The new company announced that it was exploring the potential of an initial public offering (IPO). Although Tanfield initially maintained 49-percent ownership of the company, the percentage was subject to dilution as SEV raised additional equity capital. Bryan Hansel was the company's CEO. The initial stock offering was not completed.

Smith announced in June 2013 that it had over 700 vehicles deployed and over five million miles of operation. In August 2013, Smith signed a letter of intent to form a joint venture with Taikang Technology Corporation in Taiwan for electric-vehicle assembly and distribution.

The company deployed its first vehicle-to-grid (V2G) vehicles at Fort Carson, Colorado, in September 2013. The deployment was part of the Smart Power Infrastructure Demonstration for Energy Reliability and Security (SPIDERS) project. Smith entered a letter of intent agreement the following month with battery supplier Sinopoly to develop markets in China and Taiwan. By the end of October, Tanfield's stake in Smith was less than six percent.

In May 2014, Smith reached an agreement with Hong Kong-based battery manufacturer Sinopoly Battery Limited intended to raise $40 million for the firm. On 9 June, the company introduced Italy's first all-electric commercial truck. The Italian version of the Newton was delivered to Niinivirta Transport at a ceremony in Milan.

In August 2014, Smith purchased a small Colorado company (listed on the OTC Bulletin Board) for $340,000 as part of its strategy to become a public company. That month, a UK subsidiary separated (as SEV) in a management buyout to focus on the European maintenance and service sector.

After many years of poor trading, Smith's UK arms were shut down in October 2016. This included Smith Electric Vehicles (Europe), which was placed under administration, and Smith Technologies (which was liquidated).

In February 2017, the company ceased operation due to lack of funding; however, its board was attempting to obtain financing for a reorganization.

== Vehicles ==
=== Newton Truck ===
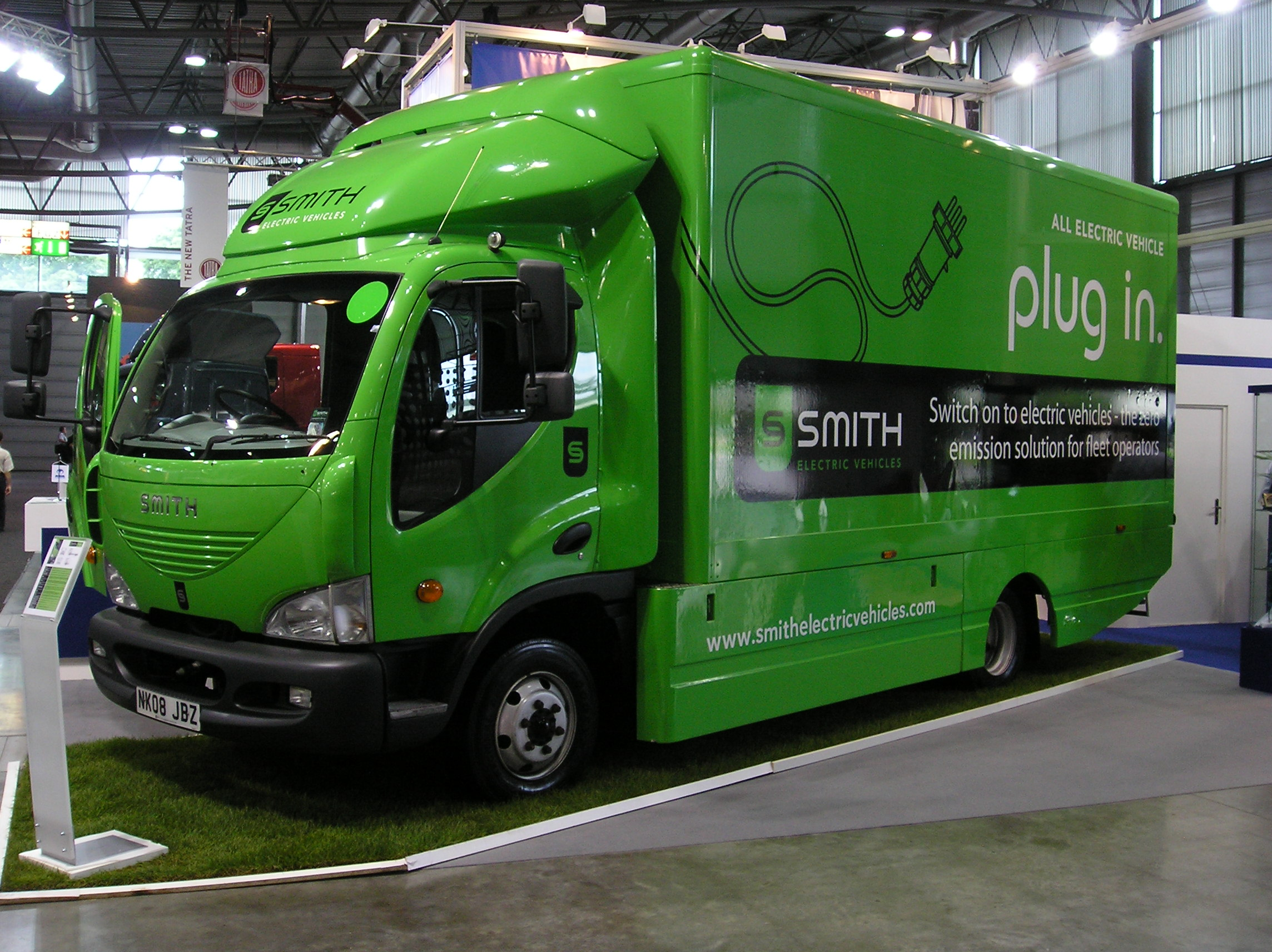
Smith Newton electric truck at the 2010 Autotec exhibition at the Brno Exhibition Centre

Introduced in 2006, the Newton electric truck was Smith's first produced, new-technology, electric commercial vehicle. The Newton was available in three GVW ratings: 7,500 kg, 10,000 kg and 12,000 kg. Each was available in a short, medium or long wheelbase. The truck was powered by a 120 kilowatt electric permanent-magnet motor and driven by lithium-ion iron-phosphate batteries with A123 Systems modules. Smith offered 80 or 120 kWh battery packs.

Customers in Europe included TNT Express, TK Maxx, DHL, Balfour Beatty, Bunzl, A.G. Barr, the Office of Public Works in Ireland and Celtic Linen in Dublin.

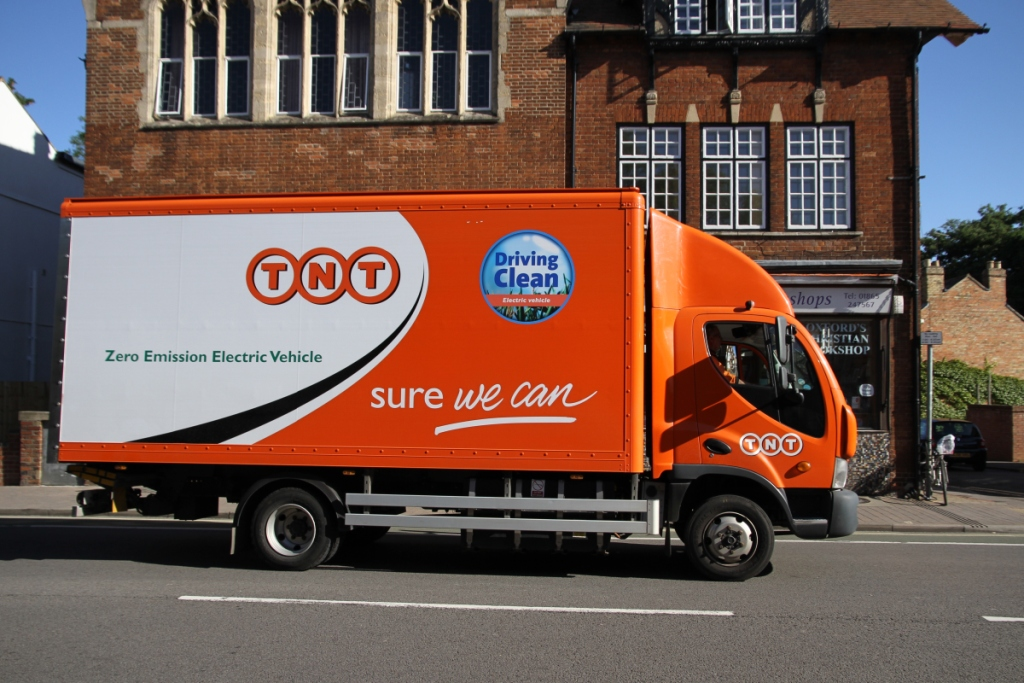
Smith Newton electric van operated by TNT Express in Oxford, England

Frito-Lay was a major US customer, with 176 Newton delivery trucks in operation by January 2011 (about one percent of Frito-Lay's total fleet). Other American customers included Coca-Cola, AT&T, Pacific Gas and Electric Company (PG&E), Staples and the U.S. Marine Corps.

Newton was named Green Commercial of the Year in the electric-vehicle section of Fleet Transport magazine's Irish Truck of the Year Awards 2010, sponsored by Castrol. The Newton was sold worldwide in October 2012 and available with three payload capacities, from 6,100 to 16,200 pounds (2,800 to 7,300 kg). The lithium-ion battery pack was available in several sizes, with a range of 40 to 100 mi (60 to 160 km) and a top speed of 50 mph (80 km/h).

=== Step-Van ===
In March 2012, Smith announced the Newton Step-Van: an all-electric, zero-emission vehicle built on the Newton platform with a walk-in body produced by Indiana-based Utilimaster Corporation.

=== Edison ===
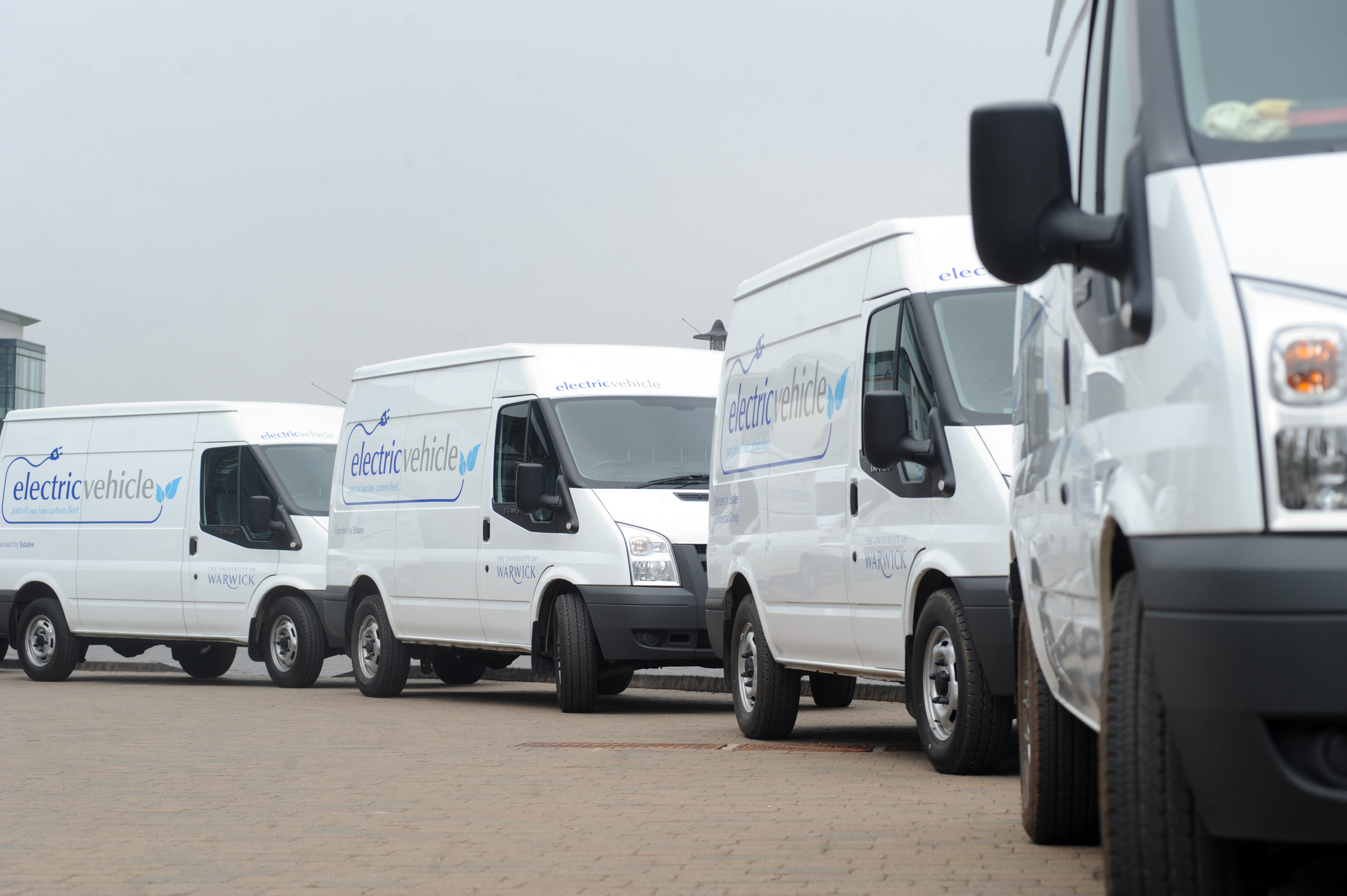
Smith Edison electric vans at the University of Warwick, England

The Smith Edison was the world's first electric van with a GVW of under 3,500 kg – a critical factor, because vehicles over 3,500 kg require a commercial driving licence. Edison, like any van under 3,500 kg, could be driven by anyone with a regular UK license.

The Edison was sold worldwide, except in the US. It was available as a chassis cab, delivery van and minibus, with a capacity varying from 1,600 to 5,100 lb (730 to 2,310 kg). The delivery van was sold with several lithium-ion battery packs, with a range of 55 to 100 mi (90 to 160 km) and a top speed of 50 mph (80 km/h). The Edison, based on the Ford Transit chassis, was powered by a 90 kW induction motor from Enova Systems and a 40 or 51kWh lithium-ion iron phosphate battery pack from Valence Technology.

In November 2009, the Edison was one of the Irish Motoring Writers Association's top five Vans of the Year. In December 2009, it was named the 2010 Eco Van of the Year by What Van magazine.

In 2012, the Edison was upgraded to use the Ford Transit Stage 5 variant. Customers were in Russia (Revolta), Netherlands (Spijkstaal), Taiwan (Taikang), Hong Kong (CLP, FedEx), the UK, Sweden (FuelReduce) and Abu Dhabi. It was discontinued in 2014.

=== London taxi ===
LTI and Smith produced the TX4E, an all-electric version of LTI's TX4 black taxicab. Smith built the first 10 TX4Es as part of the UK government's Ultra Low Carbon Vehicle Demonstrator Programme.

The vehicles were not commercially successful, and the practicality of an electric taxi has been disputed. According to Licensed Taxi Drivers' Association general secretary Bob Oddy, "Only about 40 percent of London cabbies will be able to work a full eight-hour shift on a 100-mile charge."

=== Ampere ===
The Smith Ampere was based on the Ford Transit Connect chassis. Smith produced a European prototype in 2008 and a US version the following year, after Smith US signed an agreement with Ford Motor Company in February 2009. The van was to be assembled for the North American market in the former Trans World Airlines maintenance hangar at Kansas City International Airport, and in the UK for the European market. In October 2009, Smith US announced that it would join Humvee manufacturer AM General to produce a prototype electric delivery vehicle for the United States Postal Service. The company terminated its agreement with Ford and in October 2009, Ford partnered with Azure Dynamics instead.

== Research and development ==
Smith Electric Vehicles developed driveline enhancements and ancillary systems for commercial electric vehicles, including heating and air conditioning. The company estimated that the technology could increase electric-vehicle range by up to 20 percent.

In February 2010, Smith announced that it was working with Germany's Proton Power Systems to incorporate a fuel cell into its Smith Newton truck. The small fuel cell would act as a mini-generator, topping up the batteries and possibly doubling vehicle range.

== SmithLink ==
SmithLink arose from the desire to understand how a fleet of all-electric vehicles performs under a variety of conditions, such as topology, temperature and driving style. In 2010, a team was formed to design a system for the collection and processing of data to aid product development. SmithLink was rolled out on several key UK and US fleets.

When SmithLink began, there was no secure and reliable transmission protocol for high-volume data transmission over public networks (the data portions of the mobile GPRS spectrum). Smith worked with the Advanced Message Queuing Protocol (AMQP) working group and OASIS to define a standard protocol for messaging interoperability. SmithLink was one of the first heavy users of the AMQP protocol for telemetry transmission. By 2014, the system had been installed in over 800 vehicles worldwide; in March of that year, SmithLink had recorded over of 8.5 million miles of data on its electric trucks.

== Smith US ==
The Tanfield Group announced the formation of the Smith Electric Vehicles US Corporation (Smith US) in February 2009, and the company opened for business later that year. It was the US' leading manufacturer of electric trucks.

Tanfield owned 49 percent of Smith US, with the remaining 51 percent owned by private investors. The US-majority ownership qualified the company for federal and state funding and incentives for electric trucks. Smith US owned the rights to produce and market Tanfield's commercial electric vehicles under the Smith brand. Tanfield licensed its electric-vehicle technology to Smith, in exchange for a royalty fee per vehicle sold by Smith US.

Smith US produced the Smith Newton all-electric truck in Classes 3-7. The Newton had a top speed of 55 miles per hour (90 km/h), a range of up to 100 miles (160 km) on a single charge, and was powered by lithium-ion batteries.

In July 2009, Smith US delivered its first Newton trucks at a ceremony on Capitol Hill presided over by Missouri Senator Kit Bond. Its first six customers were Coca-Cola, Frito-Lay, AT&T, Staples, Pacific Gas & Electric and Kansas City Power & Light. The initial six vehicles were produced at Smith UK's facility in Washington, Tyne and Wear and shipped to Missouri in kit form for final assembly. That month, the Department of Energy awarded $10 million to Smith US for a fleet of trial vehicles for major US corporations. Commerce Secretary Gary Locke made the grant announcement in Kansas City during a visit to Kansas City Power & Light. By October, Smith US had recruited and trained the nucleus of its workforce and Newton trucks began rolling off the production line in Kansas City.

The Newton became the first all-electric truck on the US General Services Administration (GSA) schedule, a list of products approved for purchase by federal agencies and the US military, in January 2010. The agencies spend a combined $1 billion annually on GSA-approved vehicles and automotive services.

At the end of March 2010, US Senator Claire McCaskill announced that the Department of Energy was awarding an additional $22 million, allowing Smith US to increase its build program to more than 500 Newton trucks.

Smith had its corporate headquarters in Kansas City, Missouri. The company's engineering centre of excellence was in Washington, Tyne and Wear.

Smith US made a £37 million conditional offer, equating to 50p per Tanfield share plus a "free" share in Smith US if it made an initial public offering and joined the stock market in the near future to buy out the Smith UK operation and create a company separate from the Tanfield Group. Tanfield gave Smith US a four-month period of exclusivity, giving the American company until July to raise the requisite funding and make a firm offer. After President Barack Obama's visit to the Kansas City plant on 8 July, the exclusivity period was extended 60 days to September 2010.

== Preservation ==
Five battery-electric vehicles produced by Smith have been preserved in the collection of the Transport Museum Wythall near Birmingham, England. A model S65 operated by Walsall & District Co-op and a model SS operated by Handsworth Dairies date to 1957. A pair of two-ton models operated by Walsall & District Co-op and Nottingham Co-op date to 1958 and 1959, and the fifth vehicle is a 1969 commuter mail van operated by the General Post Office. The Ipswich Transport Museum has a 1948 Smith milk float operated by the Ipswich Co-operative Society in its collection, and three vehicles used for door-to-door vegetable sales. Built in 1965, they were retired in 2001 and donated to the museum by the co-op in 2002.

== See also ==
- Battery electric vehicle
- Boom lift
- Electric bus
- Morrison-Electricar
- Wales & Edwards
