= Lithium iron phosphate =

Cathode material for lithium batteries

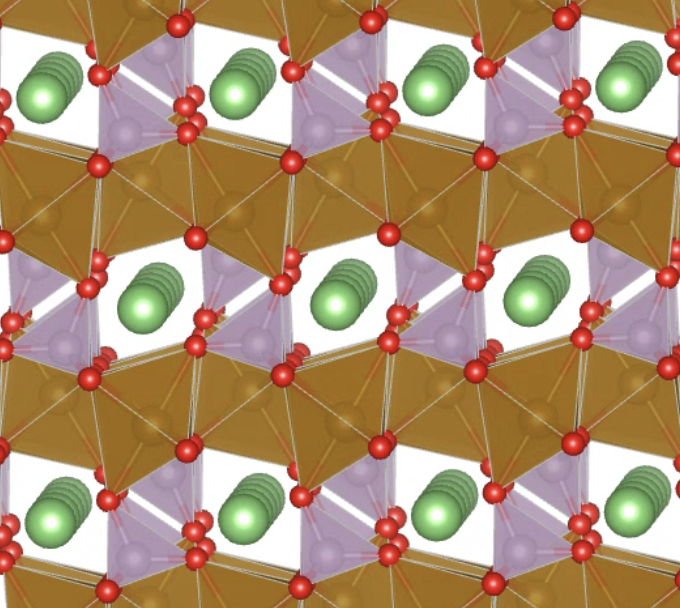

Names
- IUPAC name iron(2+) lithium phosphate (1:1:1)

Identifiers
3D model (JSmol)	Interactive image
ChemSpider	10752170
ECHA InfoCard	100.124.705
EC Number	604-917-2
PubChem CID	15320824
CompTox Dashboard (EPA)	DTXSID20571409
- InChI: InChI=1S/Fe.Li.H3O4P/c;;1-5(2,3)4/h;;(H3,1,2,3,4)/q+2;+1;/p-3 Key: GELKBWJHTRAYNV-UHFFFAOYSA-K; InChI=1S/Fe.Li.H3O4P/c;;1-5(2,3)4/h;;(H3,1,2,3,4)/q+2;+1;/p-3; Key: GELKBWJHTRAYNV-UHFFFAOYSA-K
- SMILES: [Fe+2].[Li+].[O-]P([O-])([O-])=O

Properties
Chemical formula	LiFePO_{4}
Molar mass	157.757 g/mol
Appearance	Gray crystalline solid
- Except where otherwise noted, data are given for materials in their standard state (at 25 °C [77 °F], 100 kPa). verify (what is ?) Infobox references

Lithium iron phosphate (LFP) is an inorganic compound with the formula LiFePO_{4}. It is a gray, green, or black solid that is insoluble in water.

Lithium iron phosphate is used as a positive electrode material (cathode) of lithium iron phosphate batteries, a type of Li-ion battery. The negative electrode (anode) material for these batteries is typically graphite. This battery chemistry is used in power tools, electric vehicles, solar energy installations and large grid-scale energy storage.

Lithium iron phosphate exists naturally in the form of the mineral triphylite, but as found naturally, this material has insufficient purity for use in batteries. Thus, battery-grade LFP powder must be synthesized.

== History ==
Arumugam Manthiram and John B. Goodenough first identified the polyanion class of cathode materials for lithium ion batteries. LiFePO_{4} was then identified as a battery cathode material in this class in 1996 by Padhi, Nanjundaswamy, and Goodenough. This work demonstrated reversible extraction of lithium from LiFePO_{4} and insertion of lithium into FePO_{4}. Subsequent studies demonstrated the synthesis of nanosized and carbon-coated LFP particles, which are correlated with increased capacity and cycle stability.

See the Commercialization and Intellectual Property section for the history of LFP's commercialization. As of 2021, China produced over 90% of the world's LFP.

== Synthesis and production ==
LiFePO_{4} may be synthesized by a variety of methods, including: solid-state synthesis, emulsion drying, sol-gel process, solution coprecipitation, thin-film deposition, mechanochemical activation, microwave-assisted synthesis (in which microwave energy is applied to accelerate chemical reactions, resulting in reduced synthesis time and energy consumption), hydrothermal synthesis, (ultrasonic) spray pyrolysis, and molten state synthesis.

Of these, solid-state synthesis (ceramic method) is the most commonly employed in industrial level production. In a typical synthesis, iron(III) oxalate is reacted with ammonium dihydrogen phosphate ((NH_{4})(H_{2}PO_{4})), diammonium hydrogen phosphate ((NH_{4})_{2}(HPO_{4})), or phosphoric acid (H_{3}PO_{4}) to synthesize iron(III) phosphate. Iron(III) phosphate is mixed with lithium carbonate (or another lithium source, such as lithium hydroxide), and a carbon source (such as glucose, sucrose or starch, see Carbon coating below), and calcined at 700–800°C. Other lithium, iron, and phosphate precursors can also be used, including iron(II) sulfate and iron(III) oxalate.

The hydrothermal synthesis routes is also industrially relevant, with main advantages being its low cost and ability to perform carbon-coating in one step.

=== Role of particle size ===
LFP nanoparticles were found to have increased capacity and rate performance compared to larger particles. The particle size was found to have an important influence on the electrode resistance and discharge capacity. Nanosized LFP particles were also found to undergo single-phase Li extraction, which could have important implications for power density.

=== Carbon coating ===
Coating LFP particles with a thin layer of carbon can be achieved during synthesis via carbothermic reduction. In addition to forming a conductive coating on the surface of otherwise electronically insulating LFP particles, the reductive synthesis environment also suppresses the formation of Fe(III) which can impede Li diffusion within the crystalline lattice. Carbon coating thicknesses of 1-10 nm are typical for increasing the conductivity of particles but allowing for Li intercalation.

=== Metal substitution and coating ===
Coating LFP with inorganic oxides can also improve the electrochemical performance of LFP. Substituting other metals for the iron or lithium in LiFePO_{4} can also improve performance.

== Physical and chemical properties ==
=== Structure of LiFePO_{4} ===
In LiFePO_{4}, lithium has a +1 charge, iron has a +2 charge (ferrous), and phosphate ion carries a −3 charge, balancing the charges. The iron atom and 6 oxygen atoms form an octahedral coordination sphere, described as FeO_{6}, with the Fe ion at the center. The phosphate groups, PO_{4}, are tetrahedral. The three-dimensional framework is formed by the FeO_{6} octahedra sharing O corners. LiFePO_{4}'s corner-sharing FeO_{6} octahedra are separated by the oxygen atoms of the PO^{3−}_{4} tetrahedra and cannot form a continuous FeO_{6} network, reducing electronic conductivity.

Lithium ions are octahedrally coordinated by O, and were shown to migrate within one-dimensional channels in the framework in a zigzag manner via neutron diffraction. A nearly close-packed hexagonal array of oxide centers provides relatively little free volume for Li^{+} ions to migrate within. For this reason, the ionic conductivity of Li^{+} is relatively low at ambient temperature.

In crystallography, the crystal structure belongs to the Pmna space group of the orthorhombic crystal system. The lattice constants are approximately a = 10.33 Å, b = 6.01 Å, and c = 4.69 Å, giving a unit cell volume of 291.4 Å^{3}.

=== Structure of FePO_{4} ===
During charge, the lithium ions are extracted concomitant with oxidation of Fe(II) ions to Fe(III):

LiFe^{II}PO_{4} → Fe^{III}PO_{4} + Li^{+} + e^{−}

Extraction of lithium from LiFePO_{4} produces FePO_{4} with a similar structure. FePO_{4} adopts a Pmna space group with a unit cell volume of 272.4 Å^{3}, an approximately 7% decrease compared to that of its lithiated precursor; extraction of lithium ions reduces the lattice volume. Upon discharge, the lithium ions are reinserted to the host lattice, and Fe(III) is reduced to Fe(II):

Fe^{III}PO_{4} + Li^{+} + e^{−} → LiFe^{II}PO_{4}

This reversible reaction gives rise to a theoretical gravimetric (specific) capacity of 170 mAh/g, and energy density 540 Wh/kg.

=== Mechanism of (de)lithiation ===
The phase diagram of Li_{1-x}FePO_{4} was determined by Dodd, Yazami and Fultz, as well as by Delacourt et al. The phase separation between the lithiated LiFePO_{4} phase and delithiated FePO_{4} phase results in a wide compositional miscibility gap, and a flat voltage curve when LiFePO_{4} is used in a battery. The details of the phase separation mechanism have been investigated extensively. At high current rates on discharge, phase separation is suppressed, which could provide insight into the material's high power density.

== Applications ==
Lithium iron phosphate batteries are important for many applications, including power tools, battery energy storage systems, uninterruptible power systems (UPS), power plants, and electric vehicles. According to the IEA, LFP batteries made up half of the world's electric vehicle sales, driven largely by China.

LFP batteries have an operating voltage of ~3.3 V, which is low compared the ~3.7 V average operating voltage of Li-ion batteries utilizing lithium transition metal oxide cathode materials (such as lithium cobalt oxide (LiCoO_{2}), lithium nickel oxide (LiNiO_{2}), NMC, or NCA). This leads to lower energy density for LFP batteries. However, LFP batteries have better safety characteristics (including high temperature stability), higher power density and longer cycle life than other Li-ion battery cathode chemistries. Additionally, LFP batteries do not contain nickel or cobalt, which lowers the cost of the battery, and sidesteps ethical issues associated with cobalt extraction.

BAE has announced that their HybriDrive Orion 7 hybrid bus uses about 180 kW LFP battery cells. AES has developed multi-trillion-watt battery systems capable of providing ancillary services to the power network, including spare capacity and frequency regulation. In China, BAK and Tianjin Lishen are active in the area.

Safety is a crucial property for certain applications. For example, in 2016, an LFP-based energy storage system was installed in Paiyun Lodge on Mt.Jade (Yushan) (the highest alpine lodge in Taiwan). As of 2024, the system is still operating safely.

=== Comparison to other battery chemistries ===
In addition to the aforementioned differences between LFP and other Li-ion battery cathodes, LFP exhibits a flat discharge voltage curve. The voltage curves of lithium transition metal oxides are sloped. The flat voltage curve of LFP gives a nearly constant voltage throughout the entire use of the battery (discharge), but presents issues for state of charge estimation by a device's battery management system.

LiFePO_{4} batteries are comparable to sealed lead acid batteries and are often touted as a drop-in replacement for lead-acid applications. The most notable difference between lithium iron phosphate and lead acid is that lithium battery capacity shows only a small dependence on discharge rate. With high discharge rates, for instance, 0.8C, the capacity of the lead-acid battery is only 60% of its rated capacity. Therefore, in cyclic applications where the discharge rate is often greater than 0.1C, a lower-rated lithium battery will usually have a higher actual capacity than the comparable lead-acid battery. This means that, at the same capacity rating, lithium will cost more, but a lower-capacity lithium battery can be used for the same application at a lower price. The cost of ownership when considering the lifecycle further increases the value of the lithium battery when compared to a lead acid battery, but they have much poorer performance at lower temperatures, as covered in the section on effects of temperature.

=== Power density ===
In the initial report of its electrochemical properties, Padhi et al. claimed that LFP had low power density. Various modifications to the material, including nanosizing particles, coating particles with carbon, and doping with other elements contributed to improved kinetics of (de)lithiation and improved cycling stability, such that LFP is now considered a battery cathode material with high power performance. LFP / graphite batteries have high power performance, capable of being discharged at >5C (1C = discharge in 1 hour, and 5C = discharge in 12 minutes).

=== Effects of temperature ===
The effects of temperature on lithium iron phosphate batteries can be divided into high- and low-temperature impacts.

Generally, LFP batteries are less susceptible to thermal runaway reactions like those in lithium cobalt batteries; they exhibit better performance at elevated temperatures. Research has shown that at room temperature (23 °C), the initial capacity loss approximates 40-50 mAh/g. However, at 40 °C and 60 °C, the capacity losses approximate 25 and 15 mAh/g respectively, but these capacity losses were spread over 20 cycles instead of a bulk loss like that in the case of room temperature capacity loss.

However, this is only true for a short cycling timeframe. A later year-long study has shown that, despite LFP batteries having double the equivalent complete cycle, the capacity fade rate increased with increasing temperature for LFP cells, but higher temperature did not affect NCA cells or had a negligible impact on the ageing of NMC cells. This capacity fade is primarily due to the solid electrolyte interface (SEI) formation reaction being accelerated by increasing temperature.

LFP batteries are particularly affected by low temperatures, which may hinder their use in high-latitude regions. The initial discharge capacities for LFP/C samples at temperatures of 23, 0, -10, and -20 °C are 141.8, 92.7, 57.9 and 46.7 mAh/g with coulombic efficiency 91.2%, 74.5%, 63.6% and 61.3%. These losses are accounted for by the slow diffusion of lithium ions within the electrodes and the formation of SEI at lower temperatures, which subsequently increases the charge-transfer resistance at the electrolyte-electrode interfaces. Another possible cause of the lowered capacity formation is lithium plating. As mentioned above, low temperature reduces the diffusion rate of lithium ions within the electrodes, allowing the lithium plating rate to compete with the intercalation rate. Colder conditions lead to higher growth rates and shift the initial point to a lower state of charge, meaning the plating process starts earlier. Lithium plating uses up lithium which then compete with the intercalation of lithium into graphite, decreasing the capacity of the batteries. The aggregated lithium ions are deposited on the surface of electrodes in the form of "plates" or even dendrites, which may penetrate the separators, short-circuiting the battery completely.

== LiMPO_{4} ==
With general chemical formula of LiMPO_{4}, compounds in the LiFePO_{4} family adopt the olivine structure. M includes not only Fe but also Ni, Co, and Mn. The materials LiMn_{x}Fe_{1-x}PO_{4} are known as LMFP, and are particularly attractive as battery materials due to their higher operating voltage compared to LFP.

Related classes of materials include olivine A_{y}MPO_{4} (A = Li, Na, K) and tavorite structure Li_{1−x}FePO_{4}F.

== Commercialization and intellectual property ==
There are 4 groups of patents on LFP battery materials:

1. The University of Texas at Austin (UT) patented the materials with the crystalline structure of LiFePO_{4} and their use in batteries.
2. Hydro-Québec, Université de Montréal and the French National Center for Scientific Research (CNRS) own patents, which claim improvements of the original LiFePO_{4} by carbon coating that enhance its conductivity.
3. The key feature of Li_{1−x}MFePO_{4} from A123 Systems is the nano-LFP, which modifies its physical properties and adds noble metals in the anode, as well as the use of special graphite as the cathode.
4. The main feature of LiMPO_{4} from Phostech is increased capacitance and conductivity by an appropriate carbon coating. The special feature of LiFePO_{4} • zM from Aleees is a high capacitance and low impedance obtained by the stable control of the ferrites and crystal growth. This improved control is realized by applying strong mechanical stirring forces to the precursors in high oversaturation states, which induces crystallization of the metal oxides and LFP.

These patents underlie mature mass production technologies. The maximum production capacity is 250 tons per month.

In patent lawsuits in the US in 2005 and 2006, UT and Hydro-Québec claimed that LiFePO_{4} as the cathode infringed their patents, US 5910382 and US 6514640. The patent claims involved a unique crystal structure and a chemical formula of the battery cathode material.

On April 7, 2006, A123 filed an action seeking a declaration of non-infringement and invalidity of UT's patents. A123 separately filed two ex parte Reexamination Proceedings before the United States Patent and Trademark Office (USPTO), in which they sought to invalidate the patents based upon prior art.

In a parallel court proceeding, UT sued Valence Technology, a company that commercializes LFP products, for alleged infringement.

The USPTO issued a Reexamination Certificate for the '382 patent on April 15, 2008, and for the '640 patent on May 12, 2009, by which the claims of these patents were amended. This allowed the current patent infringement suits filed by Hydro-Quebec against Valence and A123 to proceed. After a Markman hearing, on April 27, 2011, the Western District Court of Texas held that the claims of the reexamined patents had a narrower scope than as originally granted. The key question was whether the earlier Goodenough patents from the UT (licensed to Hydro-Quebec) were infringed by A123, which had its own improved versions of LiFePO_{4} patents, that contained cobalt dopant. The results were licensing of Goodenough's patents by A123 under undisclosed terms.

On December 9, 2008, the European Patent Office revoked Dr. Goodenough's patent numbered 0904607. This decision basically reduced the patent risk of using LFP in European automobile applications. The decision is believed to be based on the lack of novelty.

The first major settlement was the lawsuit between NTT and the UT. In October 2008, NTT announced that they would settle the case in the Japan Supreme Civil Court for $30 million. As part of the agreement, UT agreed that NTT did not steal the information and that NTT would share its LFP patents with UT. NTT's patent is also for an olivine LFP, with the general chemical formula of A_{y}MPO_{4} (A is for alkali metal and M for the combination of Co and Fe), now used by BYD Company. Although chemically the materials are nearly the same, from the viewpoint of patents, A_{y}MPO_{4} of NTT is different from the materials covered by UT. A_{y}MPO_{4} has a higher capacity than LiMPO_{4}. At the heart of the case was that NTT engineer Okada Shigeto, who had worked in the UT labs developing the material, was accused of stealing UT's intellectual property.

As of 2020, an organization named LifePO+C claims to own the key IP and offers licenses. It is a consortium comprising Johnson Matthey, the CNRS, the University of Montreal, and Hydro-Québec.

== See also ==
- Lithium iron phosphate battery
- A123 Systems
- Valence Technology
