= Olin Palladium Award =

ECS Olin Palladium Award
- Awarded for: to recognize outstanding contributions to the fundamental understanding of all types of electrochemical and corrosion phenomena and processes.
- Presented by: Electrochemical Society
- First award: 1951
- Website: ECS Olin Palladium Award

The Olin Palladium Award (formerly the Palladium Medal Award) was established by The Electrochemical Society (ECS) in 1950 and is presented every 2 years to recognize outstanding contributions to the fundamental understanding of all types of electrochemical and corrosion phenomena and processes.

The award consists of a uniquely designed palladium medal bearing the medalist’s name. The design of the medal depicts Pallas Athene employing a shield, on which the seal of the Society is inscribed, to protect the metals represented by ancient symbols from the elements, earth, air, fire, and water. Recipients are also presented with a wall plaque, cash prize, Electrochemical Society Life membership, and a free meeting registration.

== History ==
The Palladium Medal Award was initially funded by the royalties derived from the sales of the Corrosion Handbook and a gift of palladium metal from the International Nickel Company. The original purpose of the medal was to encourage research and achievement in the study of the corrosion of metals and its control, or in theoretical electrochemistry upon which the understanding of corrosion is based.

In 1971 the scope was modified, and in 1977 the name was changed to The Olin Palladium Award after a generous endowment from the Olin Company.

== Recipients ==
As listed by ECS:

- 2023 Jeff Dahn
- 2021 Gerald Frankel
- 2019 Shimshon Gottesfeld
- 2017 Philippe Marcus
- 2015 Digby MacDonald
- 2013 Ralph E. White
- 2011 Koji Hashimoto
- 2009 Dieter M. Kolb
- 2007 Sergio Trasatti
- 2005 Robert A. Rapp
- 2003 Eliezer Gileadi
- 2001 Norio Sato
- 1999 John B. Goodenough
- 1997 Royce W. Murray
- 1995 Jerome Kruger
- 1993 Jean-Michel Savéant
- 1991 John S. Newman
- 1989 Brian Evans Conway
- 1987 Allen J. Bard
- 1985 Martin Fleischmann
- 1983 Morris Cohen
- 1981 Izaak Kolthoff
- 1979 Roger Parsons
- 1977 Heinz Gerischer
- 1975 Marcel Pourbaix
- 1973 Veniamin Levich
- 1971 Leo Brewer
- 1969 Thomas P. Hoar
- 1967 Paul Delahay
- 1965 Norman Hackerman
- 1961 Herbert H. Uhlig
- 1959 Alexander Frumkin
- 1957 Karl-Friedrich Bonhoeffer
- 1955 Ulick Richardson Evans
- 1953 Nathaniel H. Furman
- 1951 Carl Wagner

== See also ==
- List of chemistry awards
