= Morris Cohen (Canadian chemist) =

Canadian chemist

Morris Cohen was a Canadian chemist working for the National Research Council of Canada in Ottawa. He contributed to the sciences of corrosion and of oxidation of metals.

== Life and work ==
Morris Cohen was born in Regina, Saskatchewan in 1915. He attended Brandon University in Manitoba and graduated with a B.A. degree in 1934. He received his PhD on the topic of "Absorption Measurements by Direct Weighing" from the University of Toronto in 1939. After working as a chemist at a battery manufacturing plant, he became an employee of the National Research Council of Canada in 1943. Beginning in 1946, he was head of the corrosion section. Cohen also worked as visiting researcher the corrosion laboratory of Ulick R. Evans in Cambridge.

During the long period as active researcher from the mid 1940s to 1980, Cohen published more than 100 papers. 57 of them are presently indexed in the Scopus database; his present Scopus h-index is 30.

His research covers corrosion, e.g. of iron or steel, high temperature oxidation, e.g. of iron or nickel, and corrosion inhibition.

Cohen received the Willis Rodney Whitney Award, the Western's world's top award for outstanding scientific achievement in the field of corrosion, in 1960. In 1973, Cohen received the Outstanding Achievement Award (the later H. H. Uhlig Award) of the Corrosion Division of The Electrochemical Society. 1983, he was awarded the Olin Palladium Award of the Electrochemical Society. In 1991, the Corrosion Division of the Electrochemical Society established the “Corrosion Division Morris Cohen Graduate Student Award” in honor of his scientific contributions.

Prof. Norio Sato, who became a corrosion scientist in Japan, worked with Cohen from 1961 to 1962.
