= Leo Brewer =

American physical chemist

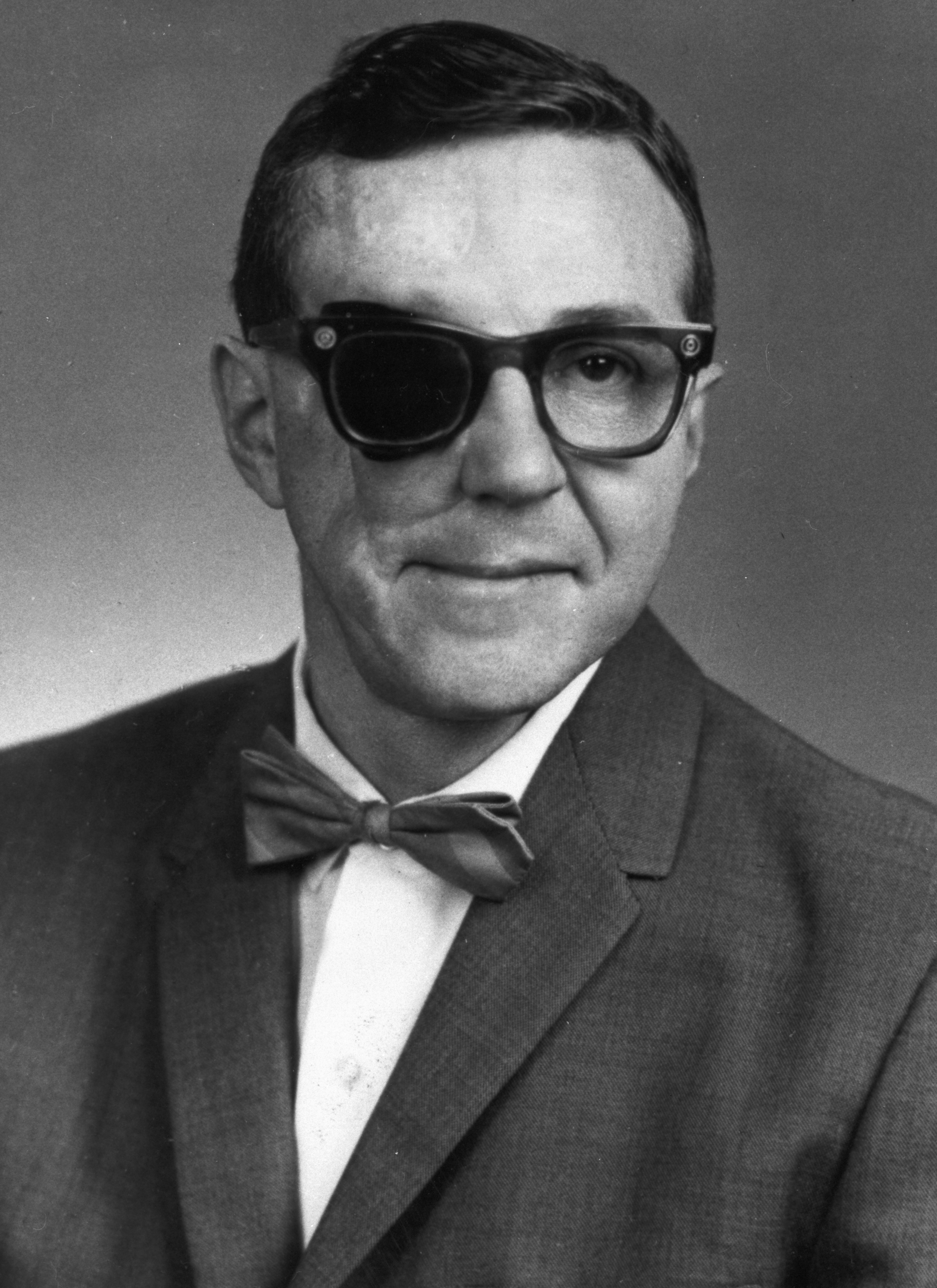
- Brewer in 1966
- Born: June 13, 1919; St. Louis, Missouri
- Died: February 22, 2005 (aged 85); Lafayette, California
- Education: California Institute of Technology; University of California, Berkeley
- Known for: High-temperature thermodynamics
- Awards: L. H. Baekeland Award (1953); Ernest Orlando Lawrence Award (1961); Olin Palladium Award (1971); William Hume-Rothery Award (1983)
- Scientific career
- Fields: Chemist
- Workplaces: University of California, Berkeley; Lawrence Berkeley National Laboratory
- Doctoral advisor: Axel Ragnar Olson

Notes
- Considered one of the founders of high-temperature chemistry. Member of the Manhattan Project.

Leo Brewer (13 June 1919, St. Louis, Missouri – 22 February 2005, Lafayette, California) was an American physical chemist. Considered to be the founder of modern high-temperature chemistry, Brewer received his BS from the California Institute of Technology in 1940 and his PhD from the University of California, Berkeley, in 1942. Brewer joined the Manhattan Project following his graduate work, and joined the faculty at the University of California, Berkeley in 1946. Leo Brewer married Rose Strugo (died 1989) in 1945. They had three children, Beth Gaydos, Roger Brewer, and Gail Brewer. He died in 2005 as a result of Beryllium poisoning from his work in World War II.

== Early life and education ==
Brewer spent the first ten years of his life with his family in Youngstown, Ohio, where his father worked as a shoe repairman. In 1929, in the wake of the Great Depression, his family moved to Los Angeles, California. It was only six years later that Brewer decided to attend the California Institute of Technology. As an undergraduate at Caltech, Leo Brewer was strongly influenced by Professors E. Swift and D. Yost, and had his first taste of research studying equilibria and kinetics of olefin hydration under Professors D. Pressman and H. J. Lucas. After the B.S. in 1940, Professor Linus Pauling persuaded him to pursue advanced instruction at the University of California, Berkeley, where he continued kinetic studies under Professor Axel Olson. In the shadow of the United States' entrance into World War II, Brewer pursued his Ph.D. with steady determination, and completed his dissertation on the effect of electrolytes upon the kinetics of aqueous reactions in November 1942, after only 28 months.

== Manhattan Project ==
Following his doctoral work, Brewer was immediately recruited by UC Berkeley professor Wendell Mitchell Latimer to join the top-secret wartime research group that would become known as the Manhattan Engineering District Project. Assigned to work under Professor E.D. Eastman (whose deteriorating health forced him to withdraw from the project soon after work had begun), Brewer headed a group composed of Leroy Bromley, Paul Gilles and Norman Lofgren, assigned with the threefold task of predicting the possible high-temperature properties of the newly discovered element plutonium, then available only in trace amounts; developing refractory materials capable of containing molten plutonium without excessive contamination, even if the worst predictions should be true; and developing a micro-analytical procedure for the determination of oxygen.

The first of these tasks led to a fundamental examination of the behavior of all elements at high temperature, and resulted in a series of papers describing the high-temperature behavior of metals, oxides, halides, and many other compounds. The second task led to the development of the refractory sulfides of cerium (Ce), thorium (Th), and uranium (U). The third task led to development of a micro method of analysis of electropositive metals using a molten platinum bath.

The immediate result of the research was the creation of the new material cerium sulfide (CeS), from which they made several hundred crucibles for use at Los Alamos National Laboratory. Brewer's crucibles were ready when the plutonium became available.

== Academic career ==
In 1946, following his service as a member of the Manhattan Project, Brewer was appointed an assistant professor in the department of chemistry at the University of California. He rose steadily through the ranks, achieving the rank of full professor in 1955. Brewer served as a faculty member of the department of chemistry for over sixty years, during which time he directed 41 Ph.D. candidates, and nearly two-dozen post-doctoral research associates.

In addition to his academic appointment, Brewer was associated with the Lawrence Berkeley National Laboratory (formerly the Lawrence Radiation Laboratory) from 1943–1994, and served as director of the Inorganic Materials Research Division of LBNL from its inception in 1961 until 1975.

Brewer's dual appointment afforded him the opportunity to take an active role in all levels of academic instruction, both inside and outside of the laboratory. Besides providing classroom instruction in solid-state chemistry, heterogeneous equilibria, and inorganic chemistry, Brewer also delivered lectures and supervised laboratory work for laboratory courses in freshman chemistry, advanced quantitative analysis, instrumental analysis, inorganic synthesis, inorganic reactions, and organic chemistry, as well as courses in chemical thermodynamics from the sophomore to graduate student level. In order to ensure a high standard of instruction at even the most basic levels, Brewer initiated a course for freshman-chemistry teaching assistants that reviewed principles and certified their ability to adequately fulfill their responsibilities.

Brewer was a caring and gifted teacher who was greatly admired by students and colleagues alike. In 1966 he was selected by the Academic Senate at UC Berkeley to deliver the annual Faculty Research Lecture. The title of his lecture was, "A Broad University Education Leads to Astrochemistry." In 1988, in recognition of his achievements as an educator, he received the Henry B. Linford Award for Distinguished Teaching from the Electrochemical Society. Upon his official retirement from the University of California, Berkeley in 1989, he was presented with the Berkeley Citation, and an academic symposium was held in his honor.

== Professional service ==
Brewer was instrumental in founding the National Academy of Sciences' National Research Council Committee on High-Temperature Chemistry, as well as organizing the first Gordon Research Conference on High-Temperature Chemistry in 1960. At the request of the Atomic Energy Commission and its successors, the Energy Research and Development Administration, and the Department of Energy, Brewer worked on numerous committees, including the DOE Council for Materials Sciences and the DOE Selection Committee for the Fermi Award.

He also maintained close ties with organizations that represented the international scientific community, including the International Union of Pure and Applied Chemistry (IUPAC), and the International Atomic Energy Agency.

Brewer sat on the editorial advisory boards of many respected scholarly journals and academic monograph series, including the Journal of Physical Chemistry Solids (1956–1992), Progress in Organic Chemistry (1958–1969), the Journal of Chemistry Physics (associate editor, 1959–1963), Progress in Inorganic Chemistry (1967–2005), Progress in Solid State Chemistry (1967–1996), High Temperature Science (founder, 1968–2005), the Journal of Chemistry Thermodynamics (1969–1978), the Journal of Solid State Chemistry (1969–1984), the Journal of the Electrochemical Society (divisional editor, 1976–1984), the Journal of Chemical & Engineering Data, the Journal of Physical Chemistry Ref. Data (1978–1981, 1989–1992), the Metals Handbook (co-editor, 1983), the Princeton Series in the Physico-Chemical Sciences for Technology (co-editor, 1983–2005), and the Handbook of Chemistry and Physics (1991).

In addition, Brewer single-handedly compiled and maintained Part II of the Bibliography on the High-Temperature Chemistry and Physics of Materials.

Besides his distinguished career as a chemist and educator, Brewer was also an avid gardener who held a keen interest in native California plant life. In 1965, he became one of the founding members of the California Native Plant Society. A species of manzanita was named after him to honor his contribution to the study and preservation of California's native flora: Arctostaphylos uva-ursi leo-breweri, also referred to as "Leo Brewer's Manzanita."

== Writings ==
Outside of his editorial work, Brewer authored nearly 200 articles on a variety of advanced topics in the field of thermodynamics. In addition, in 1961, he and Kenneth Pitzer revised Gilbert N. Lewis and Merle Randall's classic 1923 text, Thermodynamics and the Free Energy of Chemical Substances.

== Research focus ==
Although Brewer's research covered an unusually wide range of subjects and employed a multitude of techniques from theory to spectroscopy, his primary focus was on high-temperature thermodynamics, materials science (including refractory containment materials), studies of metallic phases, and the development of metallic bonding theory, incorporating the concepts of electron promotion and generalized acid-base theory. He was also involved at different points in his career with astrophysics and ceramics.

Brewer's early high-temperature work also showed that the equilibrium vapor above CuCl was mainly Cu3Cl3 molecules at normal pressures. This simple observation led to what became known as Brewer's Rule. He showed that when vapor and condensed phases are in equilibrium, the vapor species become more complex as the temperature is raised. This includes the formation of polymers and unusual oxidation states. His rule became the foundation of the field of high-temperature chemistry.

Much of his research focused on resolving discrepancies between reported experimental values and values predicted by chemical bonding models. In many instances, the reported data were shown to be in error, and the reliability of the model was confirmed. Examples are the demonstrations that the enthalpies of formation of C(g) and N(g) were much larger than the widely accepted values. Brewer's compilation of the thermodynamic properties and phase diagrams of 101 binary systems of molybdenum provides many examples of use of predictive models when no reliable experimental data are available.

In some instances, the experimental results were confirmed and it was necessary to improve the models. An example would be the neglect of gaseous polymer species at high temperatures. The war-time study uncovered evidence of polymerization in high-temperature vapors. This led to a general theory which predicted that saturated high-temperature vapors would be complex mixtures of species and that the complexity would increase with increasing temperature. These predictions have been confirmed by high-temperature workers for many systems. The refractory studies initiated with the sulfides were extended to studies of silicides and borides and other refractory phases. The experience on the Manhattan Project on the use of platinum to reduce the volatility of lanthanides and actinides were extended to a wide range of transition metal intermetallic compounds through use of the Engel correlation of electronic and crystal structures that has led to the prediction of the structures and compositions of the phases of most of the two billion multi-component phase diagrams of the transition metals.

Brewer devoted major effort to the characterization of the thermodynamic properties at high temperatures, and the critical evaluations of the thermodynamic properties from the Manhattan Project were updated periodically. One of Brewer's compilations covered the thermodynamic properties of the solid, liquid and gaseous phases of the elements and their oxides between room temperature and temperature to above 3000 K. The thermodynamic applications of these data were well-illustrated by the 2nd edition of Lewis and Randall's Thermodynamics, which Brewer and Kenneth Pitzer revised in 1961. Brewer's global interest in all of the elements is illustrated by a paper in 1951 on the equilibrium distribution of the elements in the Earth's gravitational field.

Brewer conducted a wide range of spectroscopic studies both at high temperatures and in matrices to fix the thermodynamic properties of high-temperature vapors. From 1950 to 1970, Brewer published many papers on the analysis of the spectra produced by high-temperature gaseous molecules. Several of these papers described a molecular beam method for determining their ground electronic states. When low temperature matrix isolation was developed by George Pimentel at UC Berkeley, Brewer produced many papers on the spectra of his high-temperature molecules in a frozen inert matrix. Brewer also had a long-term interest in the electronic states of I2, and he had several papers on its remarkable complexities.

Much of Brewer's later research was aimed at characterizing the extremely strong generalized Lewis acid-base interactions between lanthanides, actinides and left-hand transition metals with the platinum group metals. A combination of high-temperature solid electrolyte cells, equilibration with oxides, carbides and nitrides, and vapor pressure measurements were used. These intermetallics were shown to be among the most stable of all types of compounds, as predicted by the Engel theory. Engel had suggested a correlation between the number of conduction electrons and the crystal structure of the metals. Brewer extended this concept to include the nature of d and f electrons, and the concept of acid-base interactions. Starting investigations with undergraduate students, he tested these ideas by heating ZrC with the noble metal platinum, and found that the formation of ZrPt3 released a great deal of energy despite the great stability of ZrC. Over several years Brewer developed the Brewer-Engel theory for such bonds, and he published many papers about its application.

== Awards received ==
Brewer's professional achievements were recognized with many awards and honors, including the L.H. Baekeland Award of the American Chemical Society (1953), the E. O. Lawrence Award of the Atomic Energy Commission (1961), the Olin Palladium Award of the Electrochemical Society (1971), and the William Hume-Rothery Award of the Metallurgical Society of the American Institute of Mining (1983). Brewer also served as a Guggenheim Fellow (1950) and as an elected member of the National Academy of Sciences (1959), the American Academy of Arts and Sciences (1979), and the American Society for Metals. In 1984, a special festschrift in his honor was prepared by his former students and colleagues, published under the title Modern High Temperature Science.

Partially adapted from an autobiographical essay written by Leo Brewer, as well as biographical essays prepared by his colleagues and students, including Paul Gilles, Karen Kruschwitz, Rollie Myers, Gerd Rosenblatt, Herbert L. Strauss, Richard M. Brewer, and Jane Scheiber.

== Personal medical obstacle ==
In 1960, he was diagnosed with cancer, which was treated by surgical removal of his right eye and considerable periorbital facial tissue and bone. He believed that this was caused by some of his work with toxic or radioactive chemicals. This did not cause any significant reduction or impairment in his work.
