= Héctor D. Abruña =

Puerto Rican chemist (b. 1953)

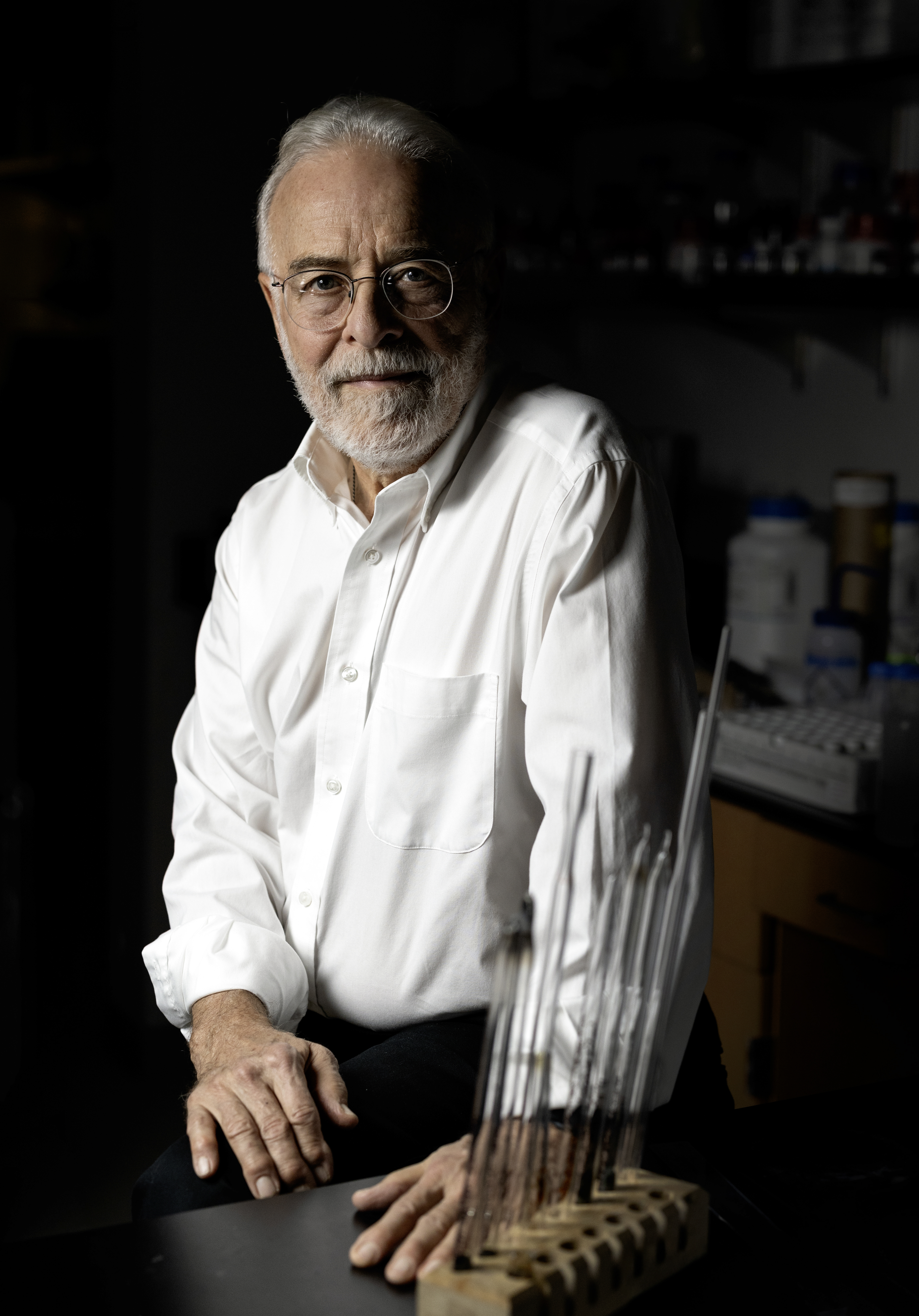
- Abruña in 2025
- Born: 1953 (age 72–73); Santurce, Puerto Rico
- Education: Rensselaer Polytechnic Institute (BS, 1975 & MS, 1976); University of North Carolina at Chapel Hill (PhD, 1980)
- Awards: Member of the National Academy Sciences (2018); Member of the American Academy of Arts and Sciences (2007); Fellow of the American Association for the Advancement of Science (2006)
- Scientific career
- Fields: Electrochemistry
- Workplaces: Cornell University
- Doctoral students: Ana Guadalupe

Héctor Daniel Abruña (born on November 8 1953) is a Puerto Rican physical chemist whose work focuses on electrochemistry, molecular electronics, fuel cells, batteries, and electrocatalysis. Abruña is director of the Energy Materials Center and Emile M. Chamot professor for chemistry at Cornell University. He became a Fellow of the American Association for the Advancement of Science in 2006, a Member of the American Academy of Arts and Sciences in 2007, and a Member of the National Academy of Sciences in 2018. Abruña conducts research into battery and fuel cell systems using electrochemical techniques and X-ray microscopy and spectroscopy methods.

== Early life and education ==
Abruña was born in Santurce, San Juan, Puerto Rico, in 1953 and grew up in Puerto Rico. He studied at Rensselaer Polytechnic Institute in Troy, New York, graduating with his bachelor of science degree in 1975 and master of science degree in 1976. He then earned a PhD in analytical chemistry at the University of North Carolina at Chapel Hill in 1980 under the direction of Thomas Meyer. As a postdoc, Abruña worked with Allen J. Bard at University of Texas at Austin.

== Career ==
In 1982, Abruña became a professor at the University of Puerto Rico. He joined the faculty at Cornell University in 1983.

Abruña chaired the Department of Chemistry and Chemical Biology 2004–2008. He is director of the Energy Materials Center at Cornell (previously the Cornell Fuel Cell Institute). In 2018, Abruña became the lead of the Center for Alkaline-Based Energy Solutions (CABES) at Cornell University, supported by the United States Department of Energy.

Abruña was co-chair of the Basic Energy Sciences Workshop on Electrical Energy Storage hosted by the United States Department of Energy in 2007 and acted as a principal editor on the report Basic Research Needs for Electrical Energy Storage. He chaired the 2006 Electrochemistry Gordon Research Conference, supported through the NSF and DOE.

Abruña advocates for underrepresented minorities to join the sciences at Cornell, and actively recruits students from Puerto Rican universities to access research and mentors in the Cornell High Energy Synchrotron Source. Fifteen of the 55 students who graduated from Abruña's group as of 2018 were from Puerto Rico. He collaborates on outreach activities with Casa Pueblo in Adjuntas, Puerto Rico.

Abruña co-founded the battery company Lionano in 2013, with an initial grant from PowerBridgeNY. He also co-founded the startup company Ecolectro with Geoffrey W. Coates, which received funding from both the Department of Energy and the National Science Foundation.

== Research ==
Abruña develops materials to enhance fuel cell performance, in particular the oxygen reduction reaction, and researches materials for battery applications.

In 2016, Abruña developed a device that combines the large energy-storage capacity of batteries with the high charge-discharge rate of supercapacitors. The technology is based on infusing an electronically conducting polymer thin film into a covalent organic framework (COF), combining the COF's lightweight properties with the superior conductivity of the polymer.

Abruña also works on other electronics research. In 2002, he collaborated on a project that created a single-atom transistor with Paul McEuen at Cornell. Abruña created extremely small light sources with sizes of only hundreds of nanometers by depositing light-emitting polymer fibers on a silicon substrate patterned with gold electrodes.

== Honors ==
Abruña was the second scientist born in Puerto Rico to be inducted into the National Academy of Sciences.

- 1984: Presidential Young Investigator Award
- 1987: Sloan Research Fellowship of the Alfred P. Sloan Foundation
- 1987: Tajima Prize of the International Society of Electrochemistry
- 1992: Guggenheim Fellowship
- 2006: Fellow of the American Association for the Advancement of Science
- 2007: Member of the American Academy of Arts and Sciences
- 2007: Electrochemistry Award of the American Chemical Society, Division of Analytical Chemistry
- 2008: Charles N. Reilley Award of The Society for Electroanalytical Chemistry
- 2009: David C. Grahame Award of the Physical and Analytical Electrochemistry Division of the Electrochemical Society
- 2011: Faraday Medal (electrochemistry) of the Electrochemistry Group of the Royal Society of Chemistry
- 2012: Brian Conway Prize for Physical Electrochemistry of the International Society of Electrochemistry
- 2013: Fellow of The Electrochemical Society
- 2016: Electrochimica Acta Gold Medal of the International Society of Electrochemistry
- 2018: Member of the National Academy of Sciences
- 2019: Allen J. Bard Award in Electrochemical Science of the Electrochemical Society
- 2019: Frumkin Medal of the International Society of Electrochemistry
- 2021: ACS Award in Analytical Chemistry of the American Chemical Society
- 2024: Global Energy Prize
- 2024: Enrico Fermi Award
- 2025: Dreyfus Prize in the Chemical Sciences]

== See also ==
- List of Puerto Ricans
