= The Society for Electroanalytical Chemistry =

American scientific society

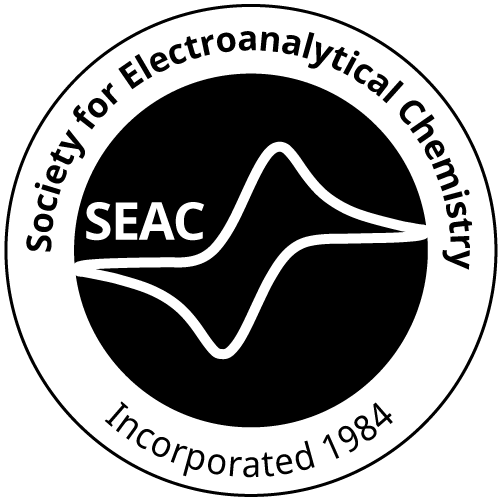
- Abbreviation: SEAC
- Formation: 1984; 42 years ago
- Type: INGO
- Legal status: Association
- Purpose: Educational
- Location: United States of America
- Region served: Worldwide
- Members: private persons
- Official language: En
- President: Carol Korzeniewski
- Website: seac.online

The Society for Electroanalytical Chemistry (SEAC) is a scientific society based in the United States which promotes advances in both basic and applied research in electroanalysis. Founded in 1984, SEAC has members at all education levels from academia, industry, and government. It provides a platform for the exchange of ideas and recognition of achievement in the electroanalytical community.

== Origins ==
In 1984, a group of electroanalytical chemists formalized a new organization for scientists who were interested in the theory and application of electroanalytical chemistry. The initial and primary purpose of SEAC was to select the annual recipients of the Charles N. Reilley Award in Electroanalytical Chemistry. The first award went to Allen J. Bard from University of Texas at Austin and was presented from University of Texas at Austin and was presented on Monday, March 5, 1984, in Atlantic City, New Jersey at the 1984 Pittsburgh Conference on Analytical Chemistry and Applied Spectroscopy in the “Symposium on New Techniques in Electroanalytical Chemistry”.

== SEACommunications Newsletter ==
SEACommunications is an online newsletter, covering recent news for the electroanalytical research and community, member news, award information and more.

== Awards ==
SEAC offers several awards as described below. Awardee history is maintained on their website.

=== Charles N. Reilley Award in Electroanalytical Chemistry ===
The Charles N. Reilley Award is given in memory of one of the most distinguished analytical chemists of the 20th century, Charles N. Reilley. The award is given annually at Pittsburgh Conference on Analytical Chemistry and Applied Spectroscopy to recognize the awardee's significant contributions to electrochemistry.

=== Royce W. Murray Young Investigator Award ===
The Royce W. Murray Young Investigator Award, named for electrochemist Royce W. Murray, is given annually at Pittsburgh Conference on Analytical Chemistry and Applied Spectroscopy to untenured professors who obtained their Ph.D. or other terminal degree within the last ten years prior to nomination. Candidates may be nominated by any member of SEAC.

=== Student Travel Awards ===
The Student Travel Awards are awarded to promising graduate students to offset the cost of travel to the Pittsburgh Conference on Analytical Chemistry and Applied Spectroscopy to deliver a presentation in at a conference symposium. The presentation should be on a topic related to their dissertation or thesis, and in some area or application of electroanalytical chemistry.
