= John Gamble Kirkwood =

American scientist

- Born: May 30, 1907; Gotebo, Oklahoma, United States
- Died: August 9, 1959 (aged 52); New Haven, Connecticut, United States
- Education: California Institute of Technology; Massachusetts Institute of Technology; University of Chicago
- Known for: Kirkwood approximation Kirkwood–Buff solution theory BBGKY hierarchy Wood-Kirkwood detonation theory
- Awards: Irving Langmuir Award (1936); ACS Award in Pure Chemistry (1936)
- Scientific career
- Doctoral students: Herbert H. Uhlig; Robert Zwanzig

John "Jack" Gamble Kirkwood (May 30, 1907, Gotebo, Oklahoma – August 9, 1959, New Haven, Connecticut) was a noted chemist and physicist, holding faculty positions at Cornell University, the University of Chicago, California Institute of Technology, and Yale University.

== Early life and background ==
Kirkwood was born in Gotebo, Oklahoma, the oldest child of John Millard and Lillian Gamble Kirkwood. His father was educated as an attorney and was a distributor for the Goodyear Corporation in the state of Kansas. In addition to Jack Kirkwood, there were two younger sisters: Caroline (1910) and Margaret (1921).

In 1909, the family moved to Wichita, Kansas. In the 1920s the family traveled to Pasadena, California to escape Midwestern winters.

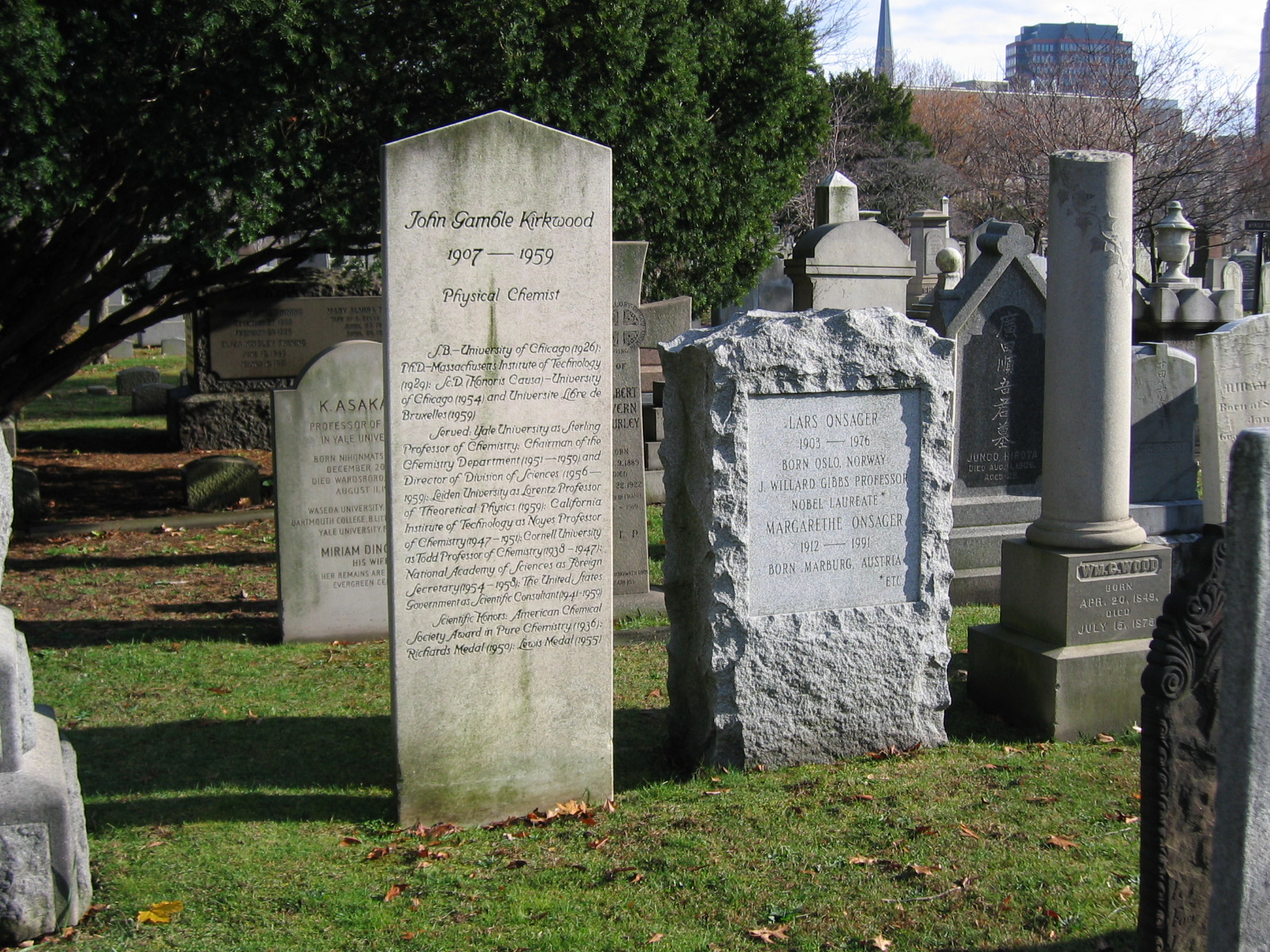
John Gamble Kirkwood's grave, next to Lars Onsager

== Education ==
While in Pasadena, Kirkwood, age 15, audited chemistry classes at Caltech. Showing remarkable talent in mathematics and chemistry, Kirkwood was persuaded by A. A. Noyes to enroll at Caltech before finishing his high school education. He attended Caltech for two years before transferring to the University of Chicago, where he was awarded his Bachelor of Science in 1926.

== Academic career ==
Kirkwood received a B.S. in physics from the University of Chicago in 1926, and a Ph.D. in chemistry from MIT in 1929, where he worked with Frederick G. Keyes. He spent two years in Europe, where he worked with Peter Debye and visited Arnold Sommerfeld.

He returned to MIT for the period 1932-1934 as a research associate in physical chemistry. There, with Frederick G. Keyes, he mentored Herbert H. Uhlig, who subsequently became a noted physical chemist, specializing in the study of corrosion. Kirkwood won the 1936 Langmuir Award in recognition of his status as the best young chemist in the United States. In the same year he was awarded the American Chemical Society Award in Pure Chemistry.

In 1935, Kirkwood became the Todd Professor of Chemistry at Cornell. During World War II, J. Robert Openheimer recruited Kirkwood to work as one of the scientists participating in the Manhattan Project to develop the atomic bomb. Kirkwood witnessed the detonation of the first Hydrogen bomb at the Bikini atoll in 1951. Following the war, in 1946, Linus Pauling proposed to Robert Millikan, the then president of Caltech, that they recruit Kirkwood to come to Caltech by offering him a newly created professorship named for Author A. Noyes who, years earlier, had recruited Kirkwood to attend Caltech as an undergraduate. Kirkwood accepted the offer and was the Noyes Professor of Chemistry from 1947 until he accepted an offer from Yale in 1952 to be the Sterling Professor at Yale and head its chemistry department. He headed the chemistry department at Yale until his death from colon cancer in 1959, at age 52.

Every other year, the department of chemistry at Yale, together with the New Haven Chemical Society, awards the Kirkwood Medal. It is noteworthy that nearly half of the recipients of the Kirkwood Medal have gone on to win the Nobel Prize in Chemistry.

Kirkwood has two chairs in chemistry in his name. Yale has a John G. Kirkwood professorship in Chemistry. Caltech has a Kirkwood-Noyes professorship.

In his classic 1939 paper "The Dielectric Polarization of Polar Liquids," Kirkwood introduced for the first time the concept of orientational correlations for neighboring molecules and showed how these control the dielectric behavior of liquids.

The year 1946 was especially notable for the appearance of the first paper in a long series that Kirkwood and his collaborators devoted to the fundamental statistical mechanical theory of transport processes.

Kirkwood was elected to the National Academy of Sciences in 1942, the American Philosophical Society in 1944, and the American Academy of Arts and Sciences in 1949.

== See also ==
- Hydrodynamic radius
