= Mars Guy Fontana =

American corrosion engineer (1910–1988)

- Born: April 6, 1910; Iron Mountain, Michigan, US
- Died: February 29, 1988 (aged 77)
- Education: University of Michigan
- Occupations: Corrosion Engineer; Professor

Mars Guy Fontana was a corrosion engineer, professor of Metallurgical Engineering at Ohio State University. He was born April 6, 1910, in Iron Mountain, Michigan, and died February 29, 1988.

== Education and other work ==
Mars Guy Fontana graduated with a Bachelor of Science followed by a Master of Science and then awarded a Doctor of Philosophy in the field of metallurgical engineering from the University of Michigan. He was known as a researcher/engineer who added to the field of knowledge in the fairly specialized area of corrosion and its various applications in engineering – corrosion engineering. As well as writing numerous papers he wrote the textbook Corrosion Engineering which was first published in 1967; there have been a number of updated editions since then. This book has been used as the primary textbook and recommended reading for at least one highly ranked University master's degree course. In his lifetime he wrote many papers in various scientific and engineering journals/periodicals. He also authored Corrosion: A Compilation.

In the late 1940s, he was given the chair in the Corrosion Center at Ohio State University. At the time it was the largest university corrosion research department in the United States. He combined the disciplines of engineering design, Material Science and Corrosion so they could be viewed together.

His contribution at the university was of such significance that he has a building named after him, the Fontana Laboratories. He also has a professorship named after him.

== See also ==
- Herbert H. Uhlig
- Ulick Richardson Evans
- Melvin Romanoff
- Michael Faraday
- Marcel Pourbaix
