= Ana Guadalupe =

Puerto Rican chemist and academic administrator (born 1956)

Chancellor of University of Puerto Rico, Río Piedras Campus
- In office October 2009 – May 2013

Personal details
- Born: 1956 (age 68–69)
- Education: University of Puerto Rico (B.Sc M.Sc.); Cornell University (Ph.D)

Ana R. Guadalupe Quiñones (born 1956) is a Puerto Rican chemist and academic administrator who served as the chancellor of the University of Puerto Rico, Río Piedras Campus from 2009 to 2013. She researches electrochemistry, specifically in the development of electrochemical sensors, biosensors, and electrocatalysts for applications in bioelectrochemistry and environmental monitoring.

== Early life and education ==
Guadalupe was born in 1956. She attended the University of Puerto Rico, Río Piedras Campus (UPR-RP). She earned a B.Sc. in chemistry in 1979 and a M.Sc. in analytical chemistry in 1984. Her master's thesis was titled, Polymer-Modified Electrodes: Electrochemical Characterization and Analytical Applications for the Extraction of Metal Species in Aqueous Solutions. Between 1979 and 1981, Guadalupe worked as a laboratory instructor at the Universidad del Sagrado Corazón. She was a teaching assistant at UPR-RP, from 1981 to 1984.

In 1987, Guadalupe completed a Ph.D. in analytical chemistry, specializing in electrochemistry, at Cornell University. Her doctoral research focused on the electrochemical properties of chemically modified electrodes. Her dissertation was titled, Polymer Modified Electrodes: Electrochemical Characterization and Applications. Héctor D. Abruña was her doctoral advisor. She completed a postdoctoral fellowship in bioelectrochemistry at the University of North Carolina at Chapel Hill from 1987 to 1988.

== Career ==
In 1988, Guadalupe became an assistant professor of chemistry at UPR-RP. Her research during this period focused on electrochemical processes, specifically the study of redox reactions and the development of electrochemical sensors. In 1989, she joined a collaborative project on the use of polymer-modified electrodes in bioelectrochemical applications, which laid the groundwork for her later research on biosensors. From 1988 to 1992, she was also an instructor at Interamerican University of Puerto Rico. She investigated sensor technology, working on the electrocatalytic oxidation of malate and lactate using ruthenium complexes, and the development of biosensors for the detection of compounds like nicotinamide adenine dinucleotide (NADH).

Guadalupe was promoted to associate professor in 1992 at UPR-RP, where she continued her work on electrochemical sensors and biosensors. Her research during this time included projects on polymer-supported electrodes, the controlled release of insulin, and the use of ruthenium complexes as molecular probes for enzyme-coupled reactions. By the mid-1990s, she was recognized for her expertise in bioelectrochemistry and had secured grants from the National Institutes of Health (NIH) and the National Science Foundation (NSF). In 1994, Guadalupe was appointed coordinator of the UPR-RP chemistry graduate program, a position she held until 1998. During this period, she supervised a number of graduate theses and expanded her research into areas such as the electrochemical production of nanoparticles and their application in catalysis.

In 1998, Guadalupe was promoted to professor of chemistry. Her work on electrochemical materials and nanostructured polymers garnered further recognition, and she began collaborating on interdisciplinary projects involving materials science and sensor technology. She also served as president of the Puerto Rico Science Teachers Association from 1991 to 1993 and was a member of the American Chemical Society, where she held various leadership roles, including president of the Puerto Rico chapter in 1998. From 2001 to 2009, she served as dean of graduate studies and research at UPR-RP, where she was responsible for overseeing the university's research initiatives and securing funding for projects in science and technology. During this time, she continued her research on electrochemical sensors and biosensors, contributing to advances in detecting environmental pollutants and pathogens like Salmonella.

In October 2009, Guadalupe was appointed acting chancellor of the UPR-RP. In this role, she provided leadership during a transitional period for the university, focusing on strengthening research and academic programs. Her tenure coincided with student protests from 2010 to 2011, sparked by an US$800 (equivalent to $1,154 in 2024) annual fee imposed by the University of Puerto Rico (UPR) board of trustees. Guadalupe called for police intervention during these protests, leading to violent confrontations and arrests, which drew widespread criticism from the student body. In March 2011, she was physically and verbally attacked by students, further intensifying the tensions. She resigned in May 2013 following a reconfiguration of the university's board of trustees. Her research in the period included the development of electrochemical materials and biosensors for environmental monitoring and public health applications. She also worked on projects involving the electrochemical characterization of porous silicon and the design of sensors for detecting waterborne diseases.

In 2021, Guadalupe was considered for the interim presidency of UPR, but her candidacy was met with opposition from students due to her controversial role during the protests. She was ultimately not selected as a finalist.
