= Herbert H. Uhlig =

Herbert Henry Uhlig (3 March 1907 – 3 July 1993) was an American physical chemist who studied corrosion.

== Biography ==
He received his B.S. in chemistry from Brown University in 1929 and his Ph.D. in physical chemistry in 1932 from MIT under John Kirkwood and Frederick Keyes(1885–1976). He worked briefly as a biochemist at the Rockefeller Institute for Medical Research (now named The Rockefeller University) and then the Lever Brothers Company before returning to MIT in 1936 as a research associate in the Corrosion Laboratory. This was interrupted by World War II, during which time he joined the staff of the Research Laboratory at the General Electric Company in Schenectady, New York, to study metal corrosion on aircraft and other military equipment. However, he returned to MIT in 1946 as an associate professor of metallurgy and director of the Corrosion Laboratory. Uhlig became a full professor in 1953 and retired in 1972. Afterwards, he became a visiting professor for institutions around the world, including some in Massachusetts, Australia, and the Netherlands. He also served as president of the international Thoreau Society and of the Rumford Historical Society in Woburn, Massachusetts.

He died in 1993.

== Research ==
Uhlig's research interests were broad and included the study of passivation of transition metals, pitting and stress corrosion, hydrogen embrittlement, metal surface properties, corrosion fatigue, and corrosion-resistant alloys. In the area of passivity, Uhlig showed that the chemisorbed oxide layer is too thin to serve as an atomic diffusion barrier in electrochemical corrosion, which was the commonly held view at the time and, rather, functions to decrease the rate of the electron transfer process (oxidation-reduction reaction). He also concluded that the minimum ratio of metals corresponding to passivity in binary alloys tends to be retained in higher-order ternary and quaternary systems. For pitting and stress corrosion, he confirmed the presence of critical potentials necessary to initiate corrosion. Uhlig served as editor of the still widely referenced "Corrosion Handbook," which was first published in 1948, and he authored the first edition of the textbook "Corrosion and Corrosion Control: An Introduction to Corrosion Science and Engineering" in 1963. Canadian metallurgical engineer R. Winston Revie was the editor for subsequent editions of each book.

== Awards and honors ==
Uhlig served as president of The Electrochemical Society (ECS) in 1955 and, at one time, served as editor of the Journal of the Electrochemical Society. From the ECS, he received the Olin Palladium Award in 1961 and the Edward Goodrich Acheson Award in 1988. He also received several awards from societies and institutions outside the United States.

The ECS named its annual outstanding achievement award the H. H. Uhlig Award in 1983. In 1982, MIT honored Uhlig by naming its Corrosion Laboratory the H. H. Uhlig Corrosion Laboratory. Since 1996, an H. H. Uhlig Award has been given annually by the National Association of Corrosion Engineers (NACE International) in recognition of outstanding effectiveness in post-secondary corrosion education.

== See also ==
- Michael Faraday
- Ulick Richardson Evans
- Marcel Pourbaix
- Mars G Fontana
- Melvin Romanoff
- Marcel Pourbaix
