= Melvin Romanoff =

American physical chemist and corrosion engineer

Melvin Romanoff was a physical chemist and corrosion engineer who specialized and wrote books about underground and soil corrosion. He worked for many years at the National Bureau of standards. His tenure at The National Bureau of Standards later renamed the National Institute of Standards and Technology was from 1937 to 1970. He was inducted into the hall of fame in 1995. For many years, NACE, the National Association of Corrosion Engineers, now NACE International presented a Melvin Romanoff award in his honor.

== Work at the National Bureau of Standards ==
The Underground Corrosion of Steel Piling was originally written as a collection of papers as Monograph 58, for the National Bureau of standards. One of the two authors was Melvin Romanoff. After his death in October 1970 it was superseded by Monograph 158 and dedicated in his honor. It was published March 1972. The citation honoring him in this publication is in the form of a eulogy and reads in part "he was the guiding light and motivating force for research at the National Bureau of Standards on underground corrosion. His work is considered by corrosion engineers throughout the world to be indispensable for an understanding of the corrosion behavior of metals in soils. The studies described in the monograph embody pioneering concepts on the nature of driven piling corrosion developed by Mr. Romanoff toward the end of his career. Therefore this publication, which is a compilation of the papers resulting from those concepts, serves as a fitting memorial for Melvin Romanoff." He died October 1970.

== See also ==
- Michael Faraday
- Herbert H. Uhlig
- Ulick Richardson Evans
- Marcel Pourbaix
- Mars G Fontana
- Corrosion
- Corrosion engineering
