= Charles Frederick Burgess =

American chemist and engineer (1873–1945)

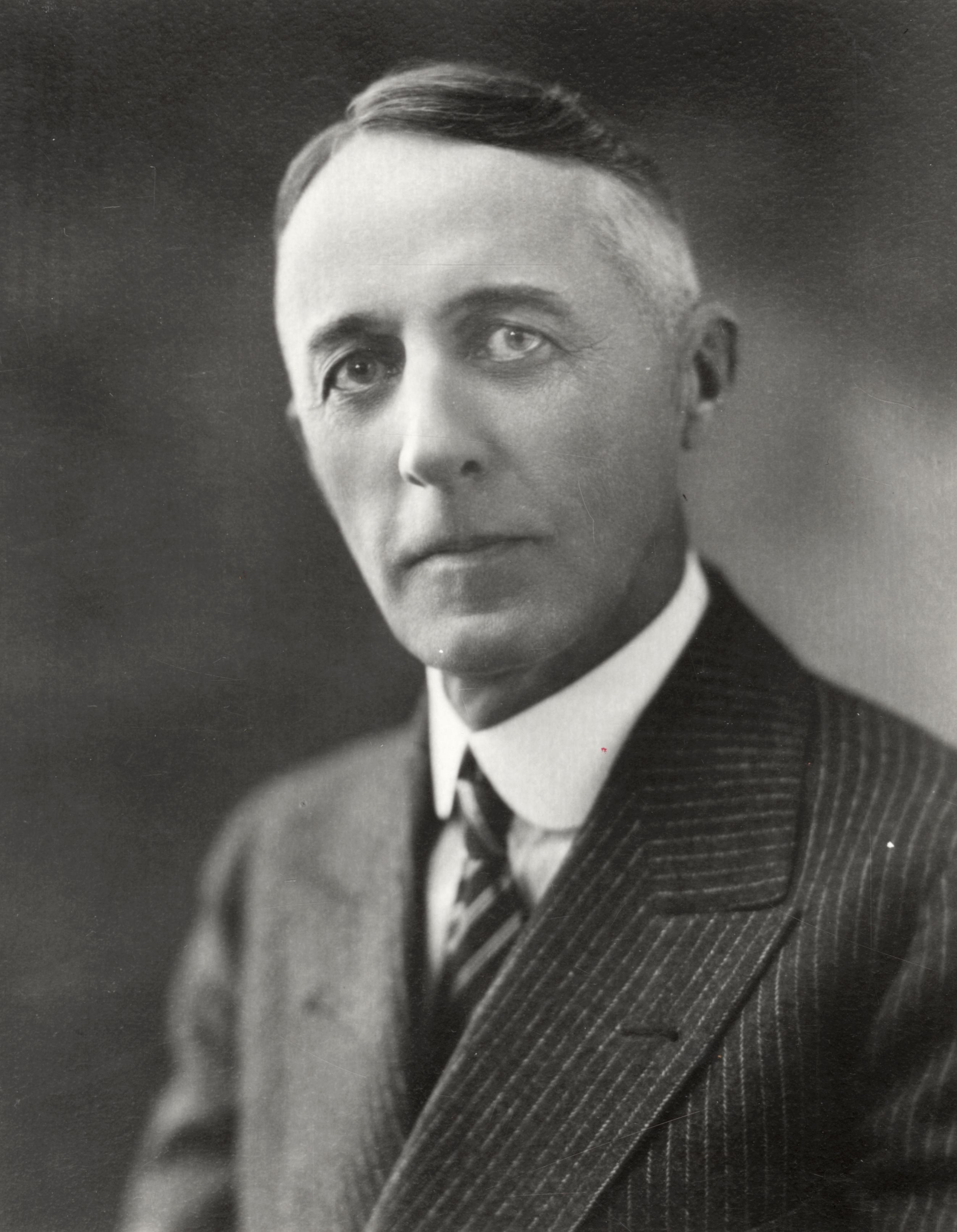
- Born: January 5, 1873; Oshkosh, Wisconsin, U.S.
- Died: February 13, 1945 (aged 72); Chicago, Illinois, U.S.
- Resting place: Riverside Cemetery; Oshkosh, Wisconsin, U.S.
- Education: University of Wisconsin (B.S.)
- Spouse: Ida M. Jackson (m. 1905)
- Children: 2
- Awards: Perkin Medal; Acheson Award
- Scientific career
- Workplaces: University of Wisconsin (1895–1913)

Charles Frederick Burgess (January 5, 1873 – February 13, 1945) was an American chemist and engineer. He was founder of the University of Wisconsin-Madison department of Chemical Engineering in 1905, and was a pioneer in the development of electrochemical engineering in the United States. In 1917 he founded the Burgess Battery Company.

== Early life ==
Charles Frederick Burgess was born on January 5, 1873, in Oshkosh, Wisconsin. He attended local schools in Oshkosh and received a Bachelor of Science in electrical engineering from the University of Wisconsin in 1895. He got an advanced degree from the University of Wisconsin in 1898.

== Career ==
Burgess joined the University of Wisconsin as instructor of electrical engineering in 1895. He later became an assistant professor. In 1900, he became professor of applied electrochemistry and chemical engineering. Of an inventive turn of mind, he developed several new processes in electrolysis, and in 1904 was made investigator of electrolytic iron alloys for the Carnegie Institute. In 1910, he helped found the Northern Chemical Engineering Laboratories, which was later renamed to C. F. Burgess Laboratories. He also served as president. In 1910, he wrote “The Strength of the Alloys of Nickel and Copper with Electrolytic Iron.”

In World War I, Burgess was a district draft board member for southern Wisconsin. He became an engineering consultant and later a board member of the French Battery Company in Madison, Wisconsin, which produced dry cells to his design used by the US Army in World War I. In 1913 he resigned from the university. His relationship with the French Battery Company deteriorated, and so in 1917 he founded the Burgess Battery Company in Madison, which became an important manufacturer of dry cell batteries for flashlights, radio, and other applications. He served as president and chairman of Burgess Battery.

Dissatisfied with taxes in Wisconsin, beginning in 1926 he moved himself and his enterprises out of the state. He went to Florida and Burgess Battery Company went to Freeport, Illinois. Burgess Laboratories was reincorporated under Delaware laws.

In 1930, he was elected to the board of directors of the Wisconsin Bankshares Corporation.

== Personal life ==
Burgess married Ida M. Jackson of Milwaukee on June 23, 1905. Together, they had two children, Jackson and Betty.

== Death ==
Burgess died from a heart attack at a Chicago hospital on February 13, 1945. He was interred at Riverside Cemetery in Oshkosh.

== Awards ==
- 1926, Doctor of Science honorary degree from the University of Wisconsin
- 1932, Perkin Medal by the Society of Chemical Industry
- 1942, Acheson Award by the Electrochemical Society
- 1944, honorary degree in engineering from the Illinois Institute of Technology
