= Edward Goodrich Acheson Award =

ECS Edward Goodrich Acheson Award
- Awarded for: Distinguished contributions to the advancement of any of the objects, purposes or activities of The Electrochemical Society.
- Presented by: Electrochemical Society
- First award: 1928
- Website: ECS Edward Goodrich Acheson Award

The Edward Goodrich Acheson Award was established by The Electrochemical Society (ECS) in 1928 to honor the memory of Edward Goodrich Acheson, a charter member of ECS. The award is presented every 2 years for "conspicuous contribution to the advancement of the objectives, purposes, and activities of the society (ECS)".

Recipients of the award receive a gold medal, wall plaque, and cash prize, ECS Life membership, and a complimentary meeting registration.

== History ==
The Edward Goodrich Acheson Award is the first and most prestigious award of The Electrochemical Society. The award was established by a gift of $25,000 from past president (and namesake of the award) Edward Goodrich Acheson. Originally, recipients were presented with a prize of $1,000, a gold medal, and a bronze replica, with the intention that the gold medal would "find its way to the safe deposit box," while the replica was reserved for "everyday use". The Acheson family later agreed to have the medal be electroplated gold in order to keep the award fund in balance. Thanks to continuous donations from the Acheson family between 1942 and 1991, the endowment fund has allowed the monetary prize to be increased 3 times since its establishment.

== Recipients of the award ==
As listed by ECS:

- 2018 Tetsuya Osaka
- 2016 Barry Miller
- 2014 Ralph J. Brodd
- 2012 Dennis W. Hess
- 2010 John S. Newman
- 2008 Robert P. Frankenthal
- 2006 Vittorio de Nora
- 2004 Wayne L. Worrell
- 2002 Bruce Deal
- 2000 Larry R. Faulkner
- 1998 Jerry M. Woodall
- 1996 Richard C. Alkire
- 1994 J. Bruce Wagner, Jr.
- 1992 Dennis R. Turner
- 1990 Theodore R. Beck
- 1988 Herbert H. Uhlig
- 1986 Eric M. Pell
- 1984 Norman Hackerman
- 1982 Henry C. Gatos
- 1980 Ernest B. Yeager
- 1978 Dan A. Vermilyea
- 1976 N. Bruce Hannay
- 1974 Cecil V. King
- 1972 Charles W. Tobias
- 1970 Samuel Ruben
- 1968 Francis L. LaQue
- 1966 Warren C. Vosburgh
- 1964 Earl A. Gulbransen
- 1962 Charles L. Faust
- 1960 Henry B. Linford
- 1958 William J. Kroll
- 1956 Robert M. Burns
- 1954 George W. Heise
- 1952 John W. Marden
- 1950 George W. Vinal
- 1948 Duncan A. MacInnes
- 1946 H. Jermain Creighton
- 1944 William Blum
- 1942 Charles F. Burgess
- 1939 Francis C. Frary
- 1937 Frederick M. Becket
- 1935 Frank J. Tone
- 1933 Colin G. Fink
- 1931 Edwin Fitch Northrup
- 1929 Edward Goodrich Acheson

== See also ==
- List of chemistry awards
