= N. Bruce Hannay =

American chemist (1921–1996)

- Born: February 9, 1921; Mount Vernon, Washington, U.S.
- Died: June 2, 1996 (aged 75); Port Ludlow, Washington, U.S.
- Education: Swarthmore College, Princeton University
- Awards: Acheson Medal (1976); Perkin Medal (1983); AIC Gold Medal (1986)
- Scientific career
- Fields: Physical chemistry
- Workplaces: Bell Telephone Laboratories

Norman Bruce Hannay (February 9, 1921 – June 2, 1996) was an American physical chemist who was vice-president of Bell Telephone Laboratories.

He was born in Mount Vernon, Washington state. He studied chemistry and was awarded a B.A. in chemistry by Swarthmore College (1942) and a Ph.D. in physical chemistry by Princeton University (1944).

His entire career was spent at Bell Chemical Laboratories, where he was a research chemist (1942–1960), chemical director (1960–1967), executive director, research, material science and engineering from 1967 to 1973, and finally vice-president, research and patents from 1973 to 1982. During his career he led research into semiconductors, superconductors, lasers and other related electronics.

He was elected a member of the National Academy of Sciences and a fellow of the American Academy of Arts and Sciences.

He edited a series of volumes entitled Treatise on Solid State Chemistry.

He died of pneumonia in 1996, he lived in Port Ludlow, Washington, was married to his wife Joan and had two daughters.

== Honors and awards ==
- 1976 Acheson Medal of the Electrochemical Society
- 1983 Perkin Medal of the Society of Chemical Industry
- 1986 American Institute of Chemists Gold Medal
