= Burgess Battery Company =

American battery manufacturer (1917–1989)

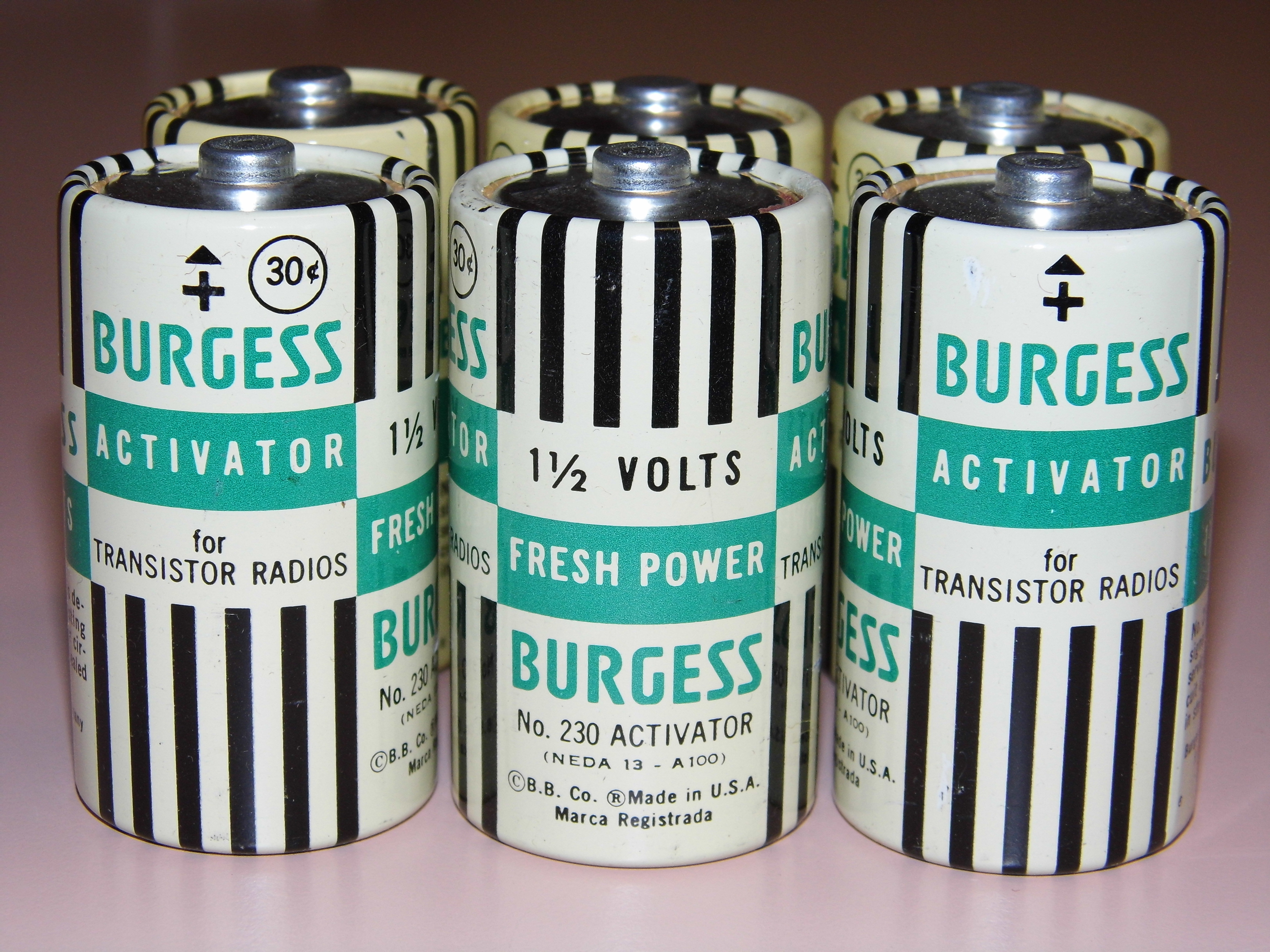
Some Burgess D cells.

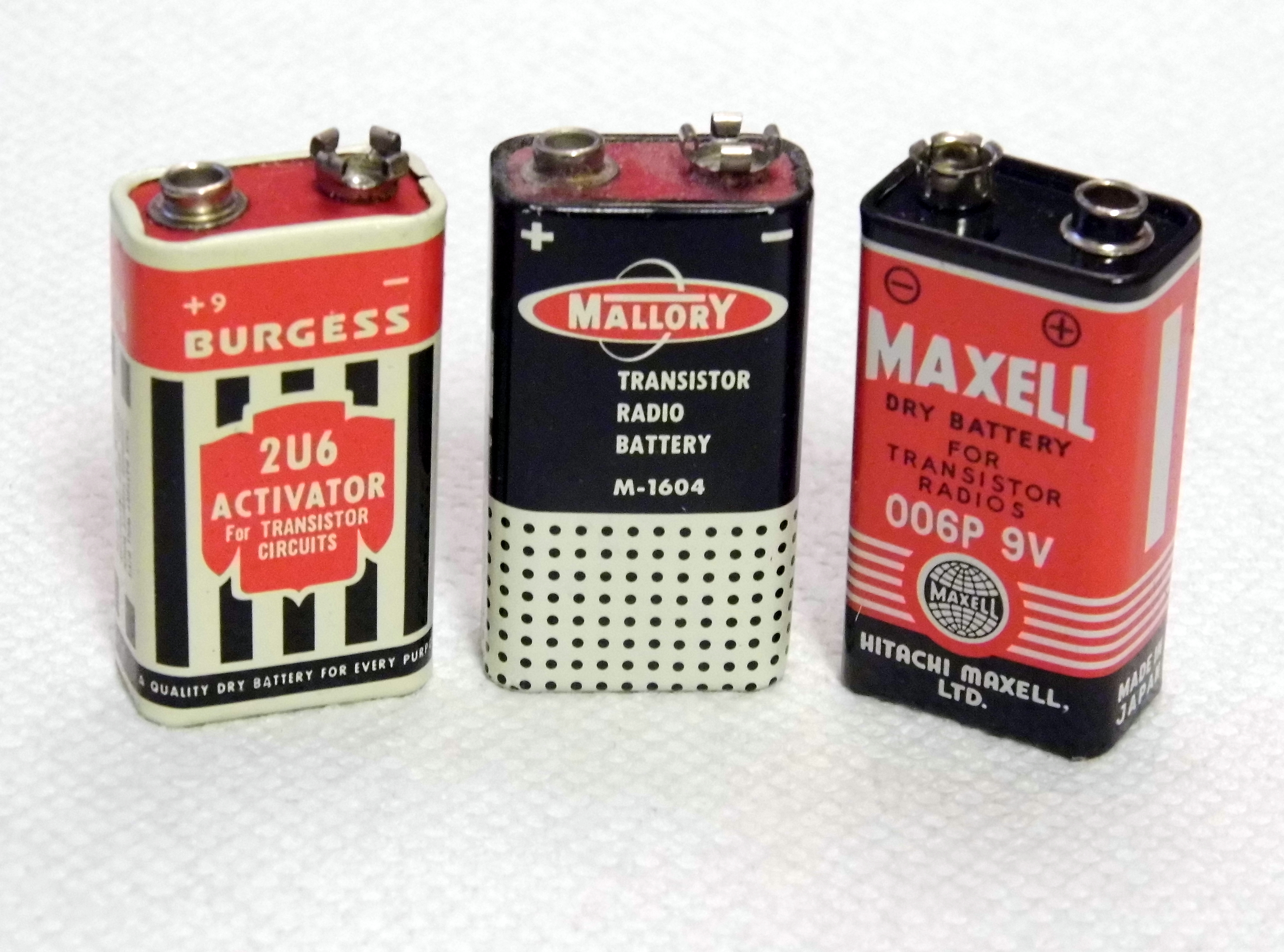
Some 9-volt transistor radio batteries. Burgess on the left.

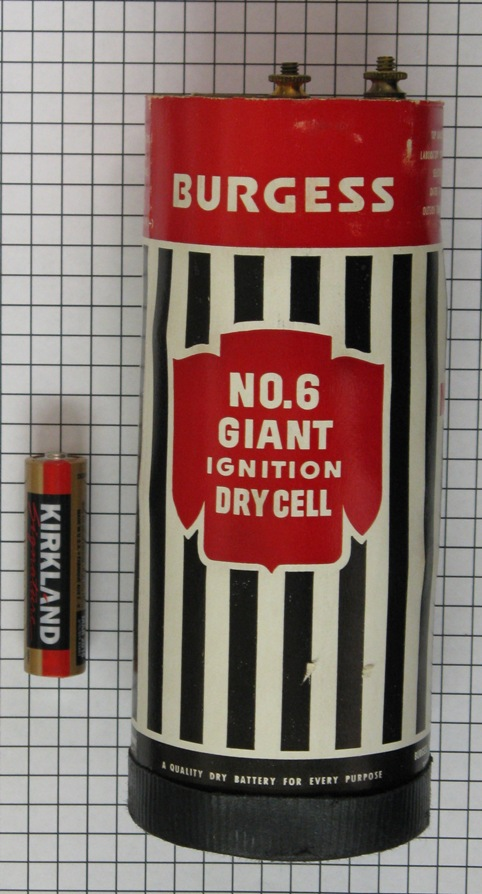
A Number 6 Burgess battery. AA cell on the left for scale. Grid is 7mm squares.

The Burgess Battery Company was a Wisconsin-based battery manufacturer that operated from 1917 until 1989. It was founded by University of Wisconsin professor Charles F. Burgess.

== During founder's lifetime ==
The Burgess Battery Company – or simply "Burgess" – was founded by Dr. Charles F. Burgess in Madison, Wisconsin and incorporated on March 1, 1917. The United States entered World War I a month later on April 6. During the war Burgess collaborated with the US Army Signal Corps to develop quality batteries for radio communication equipment. The result was the batteries Radio "A" and Radio "B".

Charles Burgess was already very experienced in the field of dry cell batteries when he started his battery company: Following graduation from the University of Wisconsin in 1895, he taught chemistry there until 1913. In 1905, he became a Full Professor and later founded the university's Department of Chemical Engineering.

In 1907, he became a consultant to the nearby French Battery Company (later renamed The Ray-O-Vac Company). He was tasked with improvement of the French No. 6 battery – the large 6-inch-tall, single-cell battery used for automobile ignition, railroad signals, telephones, doorbells and other electrical devices, and was put in charge of engineering at French. Within a year, Burgess started work, independently, on two new battery sizes: the Number 1 size (standardized later as the "C" cell) and the Number 2 size (the future "D" cell), which were similar in size to, but distinct from, the old No. 1 and No. 2 sizes produced by companies like Columbia, which were 1 inch tall and 2 inches tall, respectively. Burgess also created the Number Z size (the future "AA" cell), the Number 7 size (the future "AAA" cell), and the Number N size (the future "N" cell).

In 1910, Burgess formed and incorporated Northern Chemical Engineering Labs (NCEL). Using the trade name “Northern Lights”, NCEL made and sold some dry batteries to Madison Gas and Electric. Burgess resigned from the University of Wisconsin on July 1, 1913.

In 1915, NCEL became C. F. Burgess Laboratories, which became the parent firm for subsidiaries including the Burgess Battery Company at its founding. In 1916, Burgess severed all connections with the French Battery Company, and he incorporated the Burgess Battery Company in 1917.

After WWI, and through the 1920s, the battery industry and the company both prospered. On December 15, 1925, in Freeport, Illinois, Burgess purchased a large manufacturing building, which commenced battery production on July 1, 1926. Also in 1926, the University of Wisconsin awarded Charles Burgess the honorary degree of Doctor of Science.

In 1931, as a result of the Great Depression, the company was losing $1,000 a day. In 1937, a long labor strike led to a ruling against Burgess Battery Company.

At the outbreak of WWII, Burgess Battery Company sold primarily to universities, colleges, schools, private scientific laboratories and all facets of civilian governments large and small – aided by Dr. Burgess’s background in academia and the scientific community.

In 1944, Burgess received an honorary doctor's degree in engineering from the Illinois Institute of Technology.

During WWII, at a time when employment in the Burgess plant had reached 1,000, Burgess died unexpectedly of a heart attack on February 13, 1945, in a Chicago hospital.

== After founder's death ==
Burgess was acquired in December 1958 by Servel, Inc. (a maker of refrigerators and refrigeration equipment) and became the Burgess Battery Division of Servel. In 1967 Servel was merged into Clevite Corporation (a major maker of internal combustion engine bearings). In 1969 Clevite was merged into Gould-National Batteries, Inc., and Burgess was renamed Burgess Battery-Gould, Inc., a trade name of Gould-National Batteries.

In 1974 the Burgess operation was acquired by Charles Pindyck, Inc., an infants-wear maker in New Jersey. The name of the Burgess operation then became Burgess, Inc.

In 1985, with Burgess behind in payables and employment down to 100 workers, Charles Pindyck, Inc. sold Burgess, Inc. to Robert F. Schnoes; though he was an experienced industrial turn-around executive, the company's plant was shuttered in 1989.
