= Deon Miles =

American chemist

Deon Terrell Miles
- Education: University of North Carolina at Chapel Hill; Wabash College
- Scientific career
- Fields: Electrochemistry
- Workplaces: Sewanee: The University of the South
- Thesis: Electrochemical investigations of monolayer-protected Au clusters and functionalized nanoparticles using novel and atypical methodology (2002)
- Doctoral advisor: Royce W. Murray

Deon Terrell Miles is an American chemist who is professor of chemistry at the Sewanee: The University of the South. His research considers the development of functionalised nanoparticles and chemistry education.

== Early life and education ==
Miles was born in Gary, Indiana. He studied chemistry at Wabash College and graduated in 1997. He won several awards for chemistry and was manager of the basketball team. He delivered the commencement address. He was a doctoral student at the University of North Carolina at Chapel Hill, where he worked with Royce W. Murray and studied functionalised nanoparticles.

== Research and career ==
In 2002 Miles joined Sewanee: The University of the South, where he focusses on the development of nanoparticles and novel strategies for teaching chemistry. At Sewanee, Miles delivered a course on the science of food and chemistry of cooking.

Throughout the COVID-19 pandemic, Miles developed homemade kits that could be used to teach students about spectroscopy and chromatography from home.

== Select publications ==
- Wuelfing, W. Peter; Gross, Stephen M.; Miles, Deon T.; Murray, Royce W. (1998). "Nanometer Gold Clusters Protected by Surface-Bound Monolayers of Thiolated Poly(ethylene glycol) Polymer Electrolyte". Journal of the American Chemical Society. 120 (48): 12696–12697. Bibcode:1998JAChS.12012696W. doi:10.1021/ja983183m. ISSN 0002-7863.
- Hicks, Jocelyn F.; Miles, Deon T.; Murray, Royce W. (2002). "Quantized Double-Layer Charging of Highly Monodisperse Metal Nanoparticles". Journal of the American Chemical Society. 124 (44): 13322–13328. Bibcode:2002JAChS.12413322H. doi:10.1021/ja027724q. ISSN 0002-7863. PMID 12405861.
- Miles, Deon T.; Murray, Royce W. (2003). "Temperature-Dependent Quantized Double Layer Charging of Monolayer-Protected Gold Clusters". Analytical Chemistry. 75 (6): 1251–1257. doi:10.1021/ac025987x. ISSN 0003-2700. PMID 12659183.

== Personal life ==
Miles is married with two children. He is an ordained deacon at the Silverdale Baptist Church.
