= Jean-Michel Savéant =

French chemist (1933–2020)

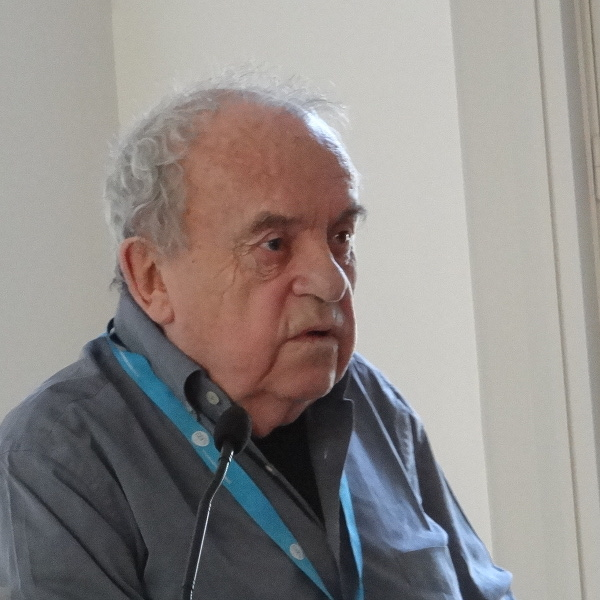
- Born: 19 September 1933; Rennes (France)
- Died: 16 August 2020 (aged 86)
- Awards: CNRS Silver Medal (1976); Member of the French Academy of Sciences (2000); Foreign Associate of the National Academy of Sciences (2001)
- Scientific career
- Fields: Electrochemistry
- Workplaces: Paris Diderot University; École Normale Supérieure; University of Padua; California Institute of Technology; Cornell University

Jean-Michel Savéant (19 September 1933 – 16 August 2020) was a French chemist who specialized in electrochemistry. He was elected member of the French Academy of Sciences in 2000 and foreign associate of the National Academy of Sciences in 2001. He published in excess of 400 peer-reviewed articles in chemistry literature.

== Biography ==
Born in Rennes, Jean-Michel Savéant graduated in 1958 and obtained his PhD in 1966 at the École normale supérieure. In 1971 he moved to Paris Diderot University where he founded the Laboratoire d'Électrochimie Moléculaire. He was an emeritus professor of electrochemistry in this university as well as an emeritus CNRS Research Director. He was the author of over 500 publications.

== Major contributions ==
Jean-Michel Savéant's scientific activity is outlined by the foundation and development of a new discipline - molecular electrochemistry. Molecular electrochemistry has transferred the knowledge acquired by electrochemistry towards various fields of chemistry and biochemistry, in particular towards the chemistry of electron and proton transfer, free radical chemistry, chemical reactivity theory, coordination chemistry, photochemistry, solid physico-chemistry, enzymology and catalytic activation of small molecules, especially those involved in solving contemporary energy challenges.

== Awards ==
- Prix Louis Ancel de la Société Chimique de France (1966)
- Médaille d'argent du CNRS (1976)
- Faraday Medal of the Royal Society of Chemistry (1983)
- Medaglia Luigi Riccoboni (1983)
- Prix Emile Jungfleisch of the Académie des Sciences (1989)
- Charles N. Reilley Award (1990)
- Olin Palladium Award of the Electrochemical Society (1993)
- Medaglia Luigi Galvani della Società Chimica Italiana (1997)
- Manuel Baizer Award of the Electrochemical Society (2002)
- Bruno Breyer Medal of the Royal Australian Chemical Institute (2005)
- Distinguished Fairchild Scholar at the California Institute of Technology (1988)
- Oscar K. Rice Distinguished Lecturer at the University of North Carolina at Chapel Hill (1995)
- Nelson Leonard Distinguished Lecturer at the University of Illinois at Urbana-Champaign (1999)
- Baker Lecturer at Cornell University (2002)
- Membre de l'Académie des Sciences (2000)
- Foreign Associate of the National Academy of Sciences of the United States of America (2001).
- Air Liquide Essential Molecules Challenge (2016)

== Bibliography ==
- Savéant, Jean-Michel (1966), Sur le mécanisme de la réduction électrochimique des aldéhydes et des cétones alpha-substitués, p. 272
- Savéant, Jean-Michel (1966), 2ème thèse : Etude de la polarisation chimique en chronoampérométrie à variation linéaire de potentiel, p. 268
- Savéant, Jean-Michel (2006), Elements of Molecular and Biomolecular Electrochemistry: An Electrochemical Approach to Electron Transfer Chemistry, John Wiley & Sons, p. 455, doi:10.1002/0471758078, ISBN 978-0-471-44573-9
- Savéant, Jean-Michel; Costentin, Cyrille (2019), Elements of Molecular and Biomolecular Electrochemistry: An Electrochemical Approach to Electron Transfer Chemistry (2 ed.), John Wiley & Sons, p. 616, doi:10.1002/9781119292364, ISBN 9781119292333, S2CID 242109414
