= John Newman (scientist) =

- Born: November 17, 1938 (age 87); California, U.S.
- Education: University of California
- Known for: electrochemistry
- Scientific career
- Fields: electrochemistry, physical chemistry
- Workplaces: University of California
- Website: www.cchem.berkeley.edu/jsngrp/

John Scott Newman (born November 17, 1938) is an American retired academic.

== Biography ==
A professor and renowned battery and electrochemical engineer researcher, he worked at the University of California in the Department of Chemical Engineering. The Newman Research Group was established with the goal of identifying "efficient and economical methods for electrochemical energy conversion and storage, development of mathematical models to predict the behavior of electrochemical systems and to identify important process parameters, and experimental verification of the completeness and accuracy of the models".

Newman also worked for the Electrochemical Technologies Group at Lawrence Berkeley National Laboratory where he was a Faculty Senior Scientist. While at LBNL he served as director of several Department of Energy’s energy storage programs, including the Batteries for Advanced Transportation Technologies Program. He was elected a member of the National Academy of Engineering in 1999 for contributions to applied electrochemistry and for their reduction to practice through advances in electrochemical engineering. He was an Onsager Professor at the Norwegian University of Science and Technology in 2002. Newman is regarded by many as "the father of electrochemical engineering." The Newman Method is a "numerical technique...developed for solving coupled electrochemical reaction–diffusion equations".

Professor Newman has authored more than 339 scientific publications, with more the 47000 citations, and an h-index of 95. He is the author of Electrochemical Systems with Karen E. Thomas-Alyea which is "used throughout the world as a monograph and graduate text in electrochemical engineering."

In 2010 he received the Edward Goodrich Acheson Award of the Electrochemical Society, his tenth award from the society.

Newman has graduated thirty masters and forty-three Ph.D. students and seventeen have gone on to become faculty members as of 2008. The faculty include Thomas W. Chapman (Ph.D., 1967), Kemal Nisancioglu (Ph.D. 1973), Nader Vahdat (MS, 1972), Peter Willem Appel (Ph.D. 1976), Ralph Edward White (PhD, 1977), Peter S. Fedkiw (Ph.D., 1978), James Arthur Trainham, III (Ph.D., 1979), Richard Pollard (Ph.D., 1979), Mark Edward Orazem (Ph.D., 1983), Michael John Matlosz (Ph.D., 1985), Alan C. West (Ph.D., 1989), Thomas F. Fuller (Ph.D., 1992), Bavanethan Pillay (Ph.D., 1996), Jeremy Patrick Meyers (Ph.D., 1998), Heather Darya Yaros (Ph.D., 2002), Dean Richard Wheeler (Ph.D., 2002), Charles Monroe (Ph.D., 2004), Paul Albertus (Ph.D., 2009), and Maureen H. Tang (Ph.D., 2012).
