= Cerium sulfide =

Cerium sulfide may refer to:

- Cerium monosulfide, CeS
- Cerium(III) sulfide, Ce_{2}S_{3}
