= Allen J. Bard =

American electrochemist (1933–2024)

Allen Bard
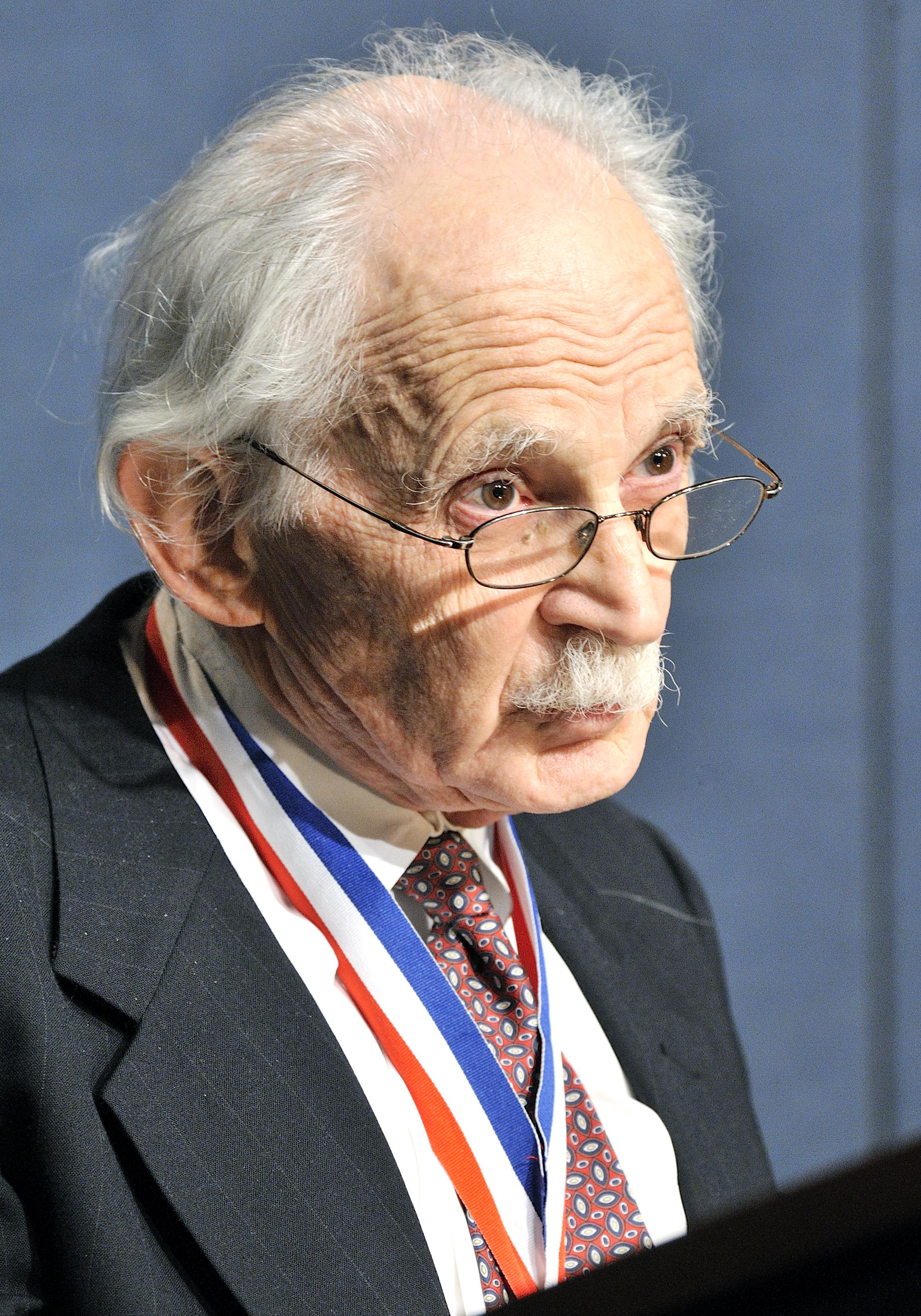
- Bard in 2014
- Born: Allen Joseph Bard; December 18, 1933; New York City, U.S.
- Died: February 11, 2024 (aged 90); Austin, Texas, U.S.
- Education: Bronx High School of Science; City College of New York (BS); Harvard University (MS, PhD)
- Awards: Olin Palladium Award (1987); Linus Pauling Award (1998); NAS Award in Chemical Sciences (1998); Priestley Medal (2002); Welch Award in Chemistry (2004); William H. Nichols Medal (2004); Wolf Prize (2008); National Medal of Science (2011); Enrico Fermi Award (2013); King Faisal International Prize (2019)
- Scientific career
- Fields: Chemistry; Electrochemistry
- Institutions: University of Texas at Austin; California Institute of Technology; Cornell University
- Website: bard.cm.utexas.edu

Allen Joseph Bard (December 18, 1933 – February 11, 2024) was an American chemist. He was the Hackerman-Welch Regents Chair Professor and director of the Center for Electrochemistry at the University of Texas at Austin. Bard developed innovations such as the scanning electrochemical microscope, his co-discovery of electrochemiluminescence, his key contributions to photoelectrochemistry of semiconductor electrodes, and co-authoring a seminal textbook.

== Early life and education ==
Allen J. Bard was born in New York City on December 18, 1933. He attended the Bronx High School of Science and graduated from the City College of New York in 1955. He then attended Harvard University, where he earned a Masters (1956) and a PhD (1958).

== Research and career ==
Bard speaking about his life and career.

In 1958, Bard began working at the University of Texas at Austin and continued there for his entire career. However, he took a sabbatical in 1973 and worked in the lab of Jean-Michel Savéant. He also spent a semester at the California Institute of Technology as a Sherman Mills Fairchild Scholar. He lectured at Cornell University for the spring term in 1987 as a Baker Lecturer. In 1988 he served as the Robert Burns Woodward visiting professor at Harvard University.

Bard published more than 1000 peer-reviewed research papers, 88 book chapters and other publications, and had more than 30 patents. He has written three books: Chemical Equilibrium; Electrochemical Methods – Fundamentals and Applications, and Integrated Chemical Systems: A Chemical Approach to Nanotechnology. The title, Electrochemical Methods – Fundamentals and Applications, is the defining text on electrochemistry in English, and generally referred to as just "Bard." He was the chief editor of the Journal of the American Chemical Society.

The Center for Electrochemistry was founded in 2006 in order to create a cooperative and collaborative group between the different types of concentrations in electrochemistry. Bard and his group were one of the original researchers to take advantage of electrochemistry to create light. The creation of light produced a sensitive method of analysis that can now be applied to a wide variety of biological and medical uses, including determining if an individual has an HIV and analyzing DNA. The Bard group also "applies electrochemical methods to the study of chemical problems, conducting investigations in electro-organic chemistry, photoelectrochemistry, electrogenerated chemiluminescence, and electroanalytical chemistry."

== Personal life and death ==
Bard was married to Fran Bard until her death in August 2016. He died in Austin on February 11, 2024, at the age of 90.

== Awards and honors ==
Among Bard's awards are the Priestley Medal in 2002, the 2004 Welch Award in Chemistry and the 2008 Wolf Prize in Chemistry. He was elected a Fellow of the American Academy of Arts and Sciences in 1990.

On February 1, 2013, President Barack Obama presented Allen Bard with a National Medal of Science for Chemistry, alongside fellow UT-Austin academic John Goodenough who received the corresponding award for engineering. "I am proud to honor these inspiring American innovators," Obama said. "They represent the ingenuity and imagination that has long made this nation great – and they remind us of the enormous impact a few good ideas can have when these creative qualities are unleashed in an entrepreneurial environment."

On January 13, 2014, Allen Bard was awarded the Enrico Fermi Award along with Andrew Sessler. In 2019 he received the King Faisal International Prize in Chemistry.

The Electrochemical Society established the Allen J. Bard Award in 2013 to recognize distinguished contributions to electrochemical science.

Bard was awarded the ACS Fisher Award in Analytical Chemistry in 1984 and the Charles N. Reilley Award in 1984. He was granted the Eastern Analytical Symposium Award in 1990.
