= Marcel Pourbaix =

Belgian electrochemist and corrosion specialist

- Born: 16 September 1904; Myshega, Tula Governorate, Russian Empire
- Died: 28 September 1998 (aged 94); Uccle, Brussels, Belgium
- Education: Université libre de Bruxelles; Delft University of Technology
- Known for: Pourbaix diagrams
- Scientific career
- Fields: Electrochemistry
- Workplaces: Université libre de Bruxelles, Belgium

Marcel Pourbaix (16 September 1904 – 28 September 1998) was a Belgian chemist and pianist. He performed his most well known research at the University of Brussels, studying corrosion. His biggest achievement is the derivation of potential-pH, better known as “Pourbaix Diagrams”. Pourbaix Diagrams are thermodynamic charts constructed using the Nernst equation and visualize the relationship between possible phases of a system, bounded by lines representing the reactions that transport between them. They can be read much like a phase diagram.

In 1963, Pourbaix produced "Atlas of Electrochemical Equilibria", which contains potential-pH diagrams for all elements known at the time. Pourbaix and his collaborators began preparing the work in the early 1950s.

== Early life ==
He was born in Myshega (Aleksin District, Tula Governorate, Russian Empire), where his father was a consultant on an engineering project. He studied in Brussels and graduated from the Faculty of Applied Sciences of the Université libre de Bruxelles in 1927.

By 1938, he had devised the potential-pH diagrams. In 1939, just before the outbreak of World War II, he presented to the Faculty his doctoral dissertation, accompanied by a thesis entitled "Thermodynamics of Dilute Aqueous Solutions. Graphical Representation of the Role of pH and Potential." The war and some confusion among the jury on the sign of electrode potential impeded the completion of his graduation process. However, the thesis was presented to the Delft University of Technology.

== Career ==
Pourbaix spent much of his career studying corrosion and developing strategies to combat it. Pourbaix' doctoral thesis had a major influence on corrosion science. Ulick Evans found this work important and arranged for an English translation, published by Arnold (London) in 1949. In the 1960s, he introduced the concept of a protection potential against the propagation of localized corrosion, particularly in crevices or cracks where acidic conditions fester (sometimes called occluded cells).

During the 1950s and early 1960s, Pourbaix and his collaborators produced potential-pH diagrams for all known elements at the time, which he published as the "Atlas of Electrochemical Equilibria" in French in 1963 and in English in 1966.

In 1949, he was one of the founders of CITCE (Comite International de Thermodynamique et Cinetique Electrochimiques) together with 13 other electrochemists, including Pierre Van Rysselberghe, John Brockris, and Jaroslav Heyrovský. In 1971 it was renamed to its current name, the International Society of Electrochemistry. In 1951 he founded the Belgian Corrosion Research Centre, which today remains an active research institute. In 1952 he founded the Commission of Electrochemistry of the International Union of Pure and Applied Chemistry, which clarified in 1953 the chaotic state of affairs then prevailing in the signs of electrode potentials.

Pourbaix traveled and lectured widely during his career. He contributed actively to the creation of an International Corrosion Council with the aim of encouraging research and international cooperation in corrosion science and friendship among researchers. In 1990, The National Association of Corrosion Engineers created a "Marcel Pourbaix Award Student Fellowship" and the ICC created in 1996 a "Marcel Pourbaix Award for International Cooperation." He published a range of papers on electrochemistry in addition to his Atlas.

== See also ==
- Corrosion engineering
- Electrochemistry
- Michael Faraday
- Mars Guy Fontana
- Herbert H. Uhlig
- Ulick Richardson Evans
- Melvin Romanoff
