= Ulick Richardson Evans =

British metallurgist (1889–1980)

Ulick Richardson Evans CBE FRS
- Born: March 31, 1889
- Died: April 3, 1980 (aged 91)
- Education: King's College, Cambridge
- Known for: Corrosion science
- Awards: Beilby Medal (1930), FRS (1949), Palladium Medal (1955), CBE (1973)
- Scientific career
- Fields: Chemistry

Ulick Richardson Evans CBE FRS (31 March 1889 – 3 April 1980) was a British chemist who specialised in metal corrosion.

== Life ==
He was born in Wimbledon, London and educated at Marlborough College (1902–1907) and King's College, Cambridge (1907–1911). He carried out research on electrochemistry at Wiesbaden and London until interrupted by the First World War, during which he served in the Army.

After the war he returned to Cambridge, where he carried out research on metal corrosion and oxidation for the rest of his working life, helping to develop quantitative and scientific laws of corrosion and writing over 200 scientific papers in the process, as well as several books.

Elected to the Royal Society in 1949, his citation stated that he was "one of the leading authorities on metallic corrosion. He has published a number of papers on this subject as well as books which have been translated into several foreign languages. In experimental technique he was the first to separate oxide films from corroding surfaces and to devise experiments to test the electrochemical theory of corrosion by differential aeration."

He retired in 1954 and died in Cambridge in 1980.

== Honours and awards ==
- 1930: won first Beilby Medal and Prize from the Royal Society of Chemistry
- 1949: elected Fellow of the Royal Society
- 1955: awarded the Palladium Medal by the Electrochemical Society.
- 1973: invested CBE

== Publications ==
- Metals and Metallic Compounds, 1923
- Corrosion of Metals, 1924
- Metallic Corrosion Passivity and Protection, 1937
- An Introduction to Metal Corrosion, 1948

== See also ==
- Michael Faraday
- Mars G Fontana
- Herbert H. Uhlig
- Marcel Pourbaix
- Melvin Romanoff
